= List of churches in Sweden =

This is an alphabetical list of churches in Sweden.

A B C D E F G H I J K L M N O P Q R S T U V W X Y Z Å Ä Ö

== A ==
- Abrahamsbergs Church (sv:Abrahamsbergskyrkan), Bromma, Stockholm
- Acklinga Church (sv:Acklinga kyrka), Tidaholm Municipality, Västra Götaland County
- Adaks Church (sv:Adaks kyrka), Västerbotten County, Norrland
- Adelsö Church, Ekerö Municipality, Uppland
- Adelövs Church (sv:Adelövs kyrka), Jönköping County, Småland
- Adolf Fredriks Church, Stockholm
- Adolfsbergs Church (sv:Adolfsbergskyrkan), Helsingborg
- Adolfsbergs Church, Örebro (sv:Adolfsbergs kyrka), Örebro
- Advents Church
  - Hallsberg (sv:Adventskyrkan) Hallsberg
  - Hjortkvarn (sv:Adventskyrkan), Hjortkvarn
- Agunnaryds Church (sv:Agunnaryds kyrka), Ljungby Municipality, Kronoberg County
- Akalla Church (sv:Akalla kyrka), Stockholm
- Akebäck Church, Akebäck, Gotland
- Ala Church, Ala, Gotland
- Alanäs Church, Strömsund
- Alboga Church, Ljung
- Alby Church, Uppland
- Alböke Church, Öland
- Ale-Skövde Church (sv:Ale-Skövde kyrka), Lilla Edet Municipality
- Alfshögs Church (sv:Alfshögs kyrka), Alfshög, Falkenberg Municipality
- Alfta Church (sv:Alfta kyrka), Alfta, Ovanåker Municipality
- Algutsboda Church
- Algutsrums Church
- Algutstorps Church
- Alhems Church
- All Saints' Church, Nyköping
- All Saints' Church, Söderköping
- All Saints' Church, Södertälje
- Allé Church, Smedjebacken
- Allerums Church
- All Saints' Church, Gothenburg
- All Saints' Church, Ljungsbro
- All Saints' Church, Lund
- All Saints' Church, Raus
- All Saints' Church, Stockholm
- All Saints' Church, Visby
- Almby Church
- Almesåkra Church
- Almtuna Church
- Almundsryds Church
- Almunge Church
- Alnö gamla Church
- Alnö nya Church
- Alseda Church
- Alsens Church
- Alsike Church
- Alskogs Church
- Alsters Church
- Altuna Church
- Alunda Church
- Alva Church
- Alvastra Monastery
- Alvesta Church
- Ambjörnstorps Church
- Amiralitets Church, Karlskrona
- Ammarnäs Church
- Amnehärads Church
- Andersbergs Church
- Anderslövs Church
- Anderstorps Church
- Andrarums Church, Andrarum
- Andreas Chapel
- Andreas Church
  - Andreas Church, Flen
  - Andreas Church, Gothenburg
  - Andreas Church, Stockholm
  - Andreas Church, Vaxholm
- Aneboda Church
- Aneby Church
- Anga Church
- Angarns Church
- Angelstads Church
- Angerdshestra Church, Angerdshestra
- Angereds Church, Gothenburg
- Ankarede Chapel
- Ankarsrums Church
- Annedals Church, Gothenburg
- Annelövs Church
- Annerstads Church
- Ansgarii Church
- Ansgars Chapel, Björkö
- Ansgars Church
  - Ansgars Church, Eskilstuna
  - Ansgars Church, Lidingö
  - Ansgars Church, Linköping
  - Ansgars Church, Sävedalen
  - Ansgars Church, Västerås
- Antens Chapel
- Anundsjö Church
- Apelgårdens Church
- Apelvikshöjds Church
- Appuna Church
- Arbrå Church
- Arby Church
- Ardre Church
- Arholma Church
- Arilds Chapel
- Arjeplogs Church
- Arlövs Church
- Arnäs Church
- Arrie Church
- Arvidsjaurs Church
- Asa Church
- Asarums Church
- Asby Church
- Asige Church
- Asks Church
  - Östergötland
  - Skåne
- Askeby Church
- Askers Church
- Askersuns Church
- Askeryds Church
- Askims Church, Gothenburg
- Asklanda Church
- Askome Church
- Askums Church
- Asmundstorps Church
- Aspeboda Church
- Aspens Church
- Asperö Church, Gothenburg
- Aspnäs Church
- Aspås Church
- Aspö Church
  - Aspö Church, Karlskrona
  - Aspö Church, Strängnäs
- Atlingbo Church
- Attmars Church
- Augerums Church
- Ausås Church
- Avaskärs Chapel
- Avesta Church
- Axbergs Church

== B ==
- Backa Church, Gothenburg
- Backaryds Church
- Backe Church
- Backen Church
- Badelunda Church
- Bagarmossens Church, Stockholm
- Baldringe Church
- Balingsta Church
- Baltaks Church
- Bankekinds Church
- Bankeryds Church
- Baptist Church
  - Baptist Church, Havdhem
- Bara Church
- Barkarö Church
- Barkeryds Church
- Barkåkra Church
- Barlingbo Church
- Barnarps Church
- Barne-Åsaka Church
- Barsebäcks Church
- Barva Church
- Baskemölla Chapel
- Bastuträsk Church
- Bellö Church
- Benestads Church
- Bengtsfors Church
- Berga Church
  - Berga Church, Högsby
  - Berga Church, Lagan
  - Berga Church, Linköping
  - Berga Church, Mariestad
- Berga Church
- Bergahems Church
- Bergkvara Church
- Bergs Church
  - Bergs Church, Härnösands stift
  - Bergs Church, Skara stift
  - Bergs Church, Västerås stift
  - Bergs Church, Växjö stift
- Bergsby Church
- Bergshammars Church
- Bergshamra Church
- Bergsjö Church
- Bergsjöns Church, Gothenburg
- Bergums Church
- Bergunda Church
- Bergviks Church
- Betania, Betaniakyrkan
  - Kungsholms Baptist Church, Stockholm
- Betel Church
  - Betel Church, Hägersten, Stockholm
  - Betel Church, Runemo
  - Bethel Church, Råå
  - Bethel Church, Höör
- Bettna Church
- Billdals Avlysta Church, Gothenburg
- Billdals Chapel, Gothenburg
- Billdals Church, Gothenburg
- Billeberga Church
- Billesholms Church
- Billinge Church
- Billingsfors Church
- Bingsjö Church
- Binnebergs Church
- Birgitta Church
  - Olshammar
  - Sundsvall
- Biskopsgården Church, Gothenburg
- Biskopskulla Church
- Bitterna Church
- Bjurbäck Church
- Bjurholms Church
- Bjurslätts Church, Gothenburg
- Bjursås Church
- Bjurtjärns Church
- Bjurums Church
- Bjuråkers Church
- Bjuröklubbs Chapel
- Bjuvs Church
- Bjälbo Church
- Bjällerups Church
- Bjäresjö Church
- Bjärshögs Church
- Bjärtrå Church
- Björka Church
- Björkbergs Church
- Björke Church
- Björkeberg Church
- Björkekärrs Church, Gothenburg
- Björketorps Church
- Björkhälla Church
- Björklinge Church
- Björknäs Church, Nacka
- Björksele Church
- Björkskata Church
- Björksta Church
- Björksätra Church
- Björksäter Church, Bålsta
- Björkviks Church
- Björkö Church
  - Björkö Church, Bohuslän
  - Björkö Church, Växjö
- Björkö-Arholma Church
- Björlanda Church
- Björna Church
- Björneborgs Church
- Björnekulla Church
- Björnlunda Church
- Björskogs Church
- Björsäters Church
  - Björsäters Church, Linköping
  - Björsäters Church, Skara
- Blacksta kyrka
- Blackstad kyrka
- Bladåkers kyrka
- Bleketkyrkan
- Blentarps kyrka
- Blidsbergs kyrka
- Blidö kyrka
- Blomskogs kyrka
- Blåhults kapell
- Blåsutkyrkan
- Blåviks kyrka
- Blädinge kyrka
- Bo kyrka
- Bockara kyrka
- Boda kyrka
  - Boda kyrka, Karlstads stift
  - Boda kyrka, Västerås stift
- Bodafors kyrka
- Bodals kyrka
- Bodarps kyrka
- Bodsjö kyrka
- Bodums kyrka
- Boge kyrka
- Bogens kyrka
- Bogesunds Slottskapell
- Boglösa kyrka
- Bogsta kyrka
- Bokenäs gamla kyrka
- Bokenäs nya kyrka
- Bolidens kyrka
- Bollebygds kyrka
- Bollerups kyrka
- Bollmoradalens kyrka
- Bollnäs kyrka
- Bolmsö kyrka
- Bolshögs kyrka
- Bolstads kyrka
- Bomhus kyrka
- Bonderups kyrka
- Bondstorps kyrka
- Boo kapell
- Boo kyrka
- Borgeby kyrka
- Borgenkyrkan, Tierp
- Borgholm Church
- Borgs Klockargård
- Borgs kyrka
- Borgsjö kyrka
- Borgstena kyrka
- Borgunda kyrka
- Borgvattnets kyrka
- Borgvik kyrka
- Borlunda kyrka
- Borrie kyrka
- Borås Caroli kyrka
- Bosarps kyrka
- Bosebo kyrka
- Bosjöklosters kyrka
- Bosvedjans kyrka
- Boteå kyrka
- Botilsäter kyrka
- Botkyrka kyrka
- Botsmarks kyrka
- Bottna kyrka
- Bottnaryds kyrka
- Bovallstrands kyrka
- Boxholms kyrka
- Brahekyrkan
- Brandbergens kyrka
- Brandstads kyrka
- Brandstorp Church
- Brastads kyrka
- Brattfors kyrka
- Breareds kyrka
- Bredareds kyrka
- Bredaryds kyrka
- Bredestads kyrka
- Breds kyrka
- Bredsäters kyrka
- Bredsätra kyrka
- Bredåkra kyrka
- Bredängs kyrka, Stockholm
- Brevens kyrka
- Breviks kyrka
  - Breviks kyrka, Hjo
  - Breviks kyrka, Lidingö
- Bringetofta kyrka
- Brismene kyrka
- Bro kyrka
  - Bro kyrka, Gotland
  - Bro kyrka, Köping
  - Bro kyrka, Lysekil
  - Bro kyrka, Säffle
  - Bro kyrka, Upplands-Bro
- Broby kapell
- Broddarps kyrka
- Broddetorps kyrka
- Bromma kyrka
  - Bromma kyrka, Stockholm
  - Bromma kyrka, Ystad
- Broängskyrkan
- Bruksvallarnas kapell
- Brunflo kyrka
- Brunnby kyrka
- Brunneby kyrka
- Brunns kyrka
- Brunnsbergs kyrka
- Brunnsbokyrkan, Gothenburg
- Brunnskyrkan, Åseda
- Brunnsängs kyrka
- Brunskogs kyrka
- Brågarps kyrka
- Brålanda kyrka
- Bråttensby kyrka
- Bräcke diakonigårds kyrka, Gothenburg
- Bräcke kyrka
- Bräkne-Hoby kyrka
- Brämaregårdens kyrka, Gothenburg
- Brämhults kyrka
- Brännemo kyrka
- Brännkyrka kyrka, Stockholm
- Brännö kyrka, Gothenburg
- Brösarps kyrka
- Brönnestads kyrka
- Bua kapell
- Bunge kyrka
- Bunkeflo kyrka, Malmö
- Bunkeflo strandkyrka, Malmö
- Bureå kyrka
- Burlövs gamla kyrka
- Burs kyrka
- Burseryds kyrka
- Burträsks kyrka
- Buråskyrkan, Gothenburg
- Buttle kyrka
- By kyrka
  - Karlstads stift
  - Västerås stift
- Byarums kyrka
- Bygdeå kyrka
- Bygdsiljums kyrka
- Bymarkskyrkan
- Byske kyrka
- Byttorpskyrkan
- Båraryds kyrka
- Bårslövs kyrka
- Båtskärsnäs kyrka
- Bäckaby gamla kyrka
- Bäckaby kyrka
- Bäckby kyrka
- Bäcke kyrka
- Bäckebo kyrka
- Bäcks kyrka
- Bäckseda kyrka
- Bälaryds kyrka
- Bälinge kyrka
  - Skara stift
  - Strängnäs stift
  - Uppsala stift
- Bällefors kyrka
- Bäls kyrka
- Bärbo kyrka
- Bärebergs kyrka
- Bärfendals kyrka
- Bäve kyrka
- Böja kyrka
- Böleängskyrkan
- Böne kyrka
- Börje kyrka
- Börringe kyrka
- Börrum kyrka
- Börstigs kyrka
- Börstils kyrka
- Bösarps kyrka

== C ==
- Capella Ecumenica på ön Gärdsholm öster om Söderköping, söder om Vikbolandet
- Carl Gustafs kyrka
- Carl Johans kyrka, Gothenburg
- Carlskyrkan
- Caroli kyrka, Malmö
- Cecilia Church, Jönköping
- Centrumkyrkan
  - Centrumkyrkan, Avesta
  - Centrumkyrkan, Bjuv
  - Centrumkyrkan, Heby
  - Centrumkyrkan, Tumba
- Charlottenborgskyrkan
- Christinae kyrka
  - Christinae kyrka, Alingsås
- Christina Church, Jönköping
- Citykyrkan
  - Citykyrkan, Linköping
  - Citykyrkan, Stockholm
  - Citykyrkan, Västerås
  - Citykyrkan, Älmhult

== D ==
- Dagsbergs kyrka
- Dagstorps kyrka
- Dagsås kyrka
- Dala kyrka
- Dalabergskyrkan
- Dalarö kyrka
- Dalens sjukhuskyrka, Stockholm
- Dalby kyrka
  - Dalby kyrka, Uppsala stift
  - Dalby kyrka, Karlstads stift
- Dalby heligkorskyrka
- Dalhems kyrka
  - Dalhems kyrka, Gotland
  - Dalhems kyrka, Östergötland
- Dalköpinge kyrka
- Dals kyrka
- Dals Långeds kyrka
- Dals-Eds kyrka
- Dalskogs kyrka
- Dalstorps kyrka
- Dalums kyrka
- Dalviks kyrka
- Dammsvedjans kyrka
- Danasjö kapell
- Danderyds kyrka
- Danmarks kyrka
- Dannemora kyrka
- Dannike kyrka
- Dannäs kyrka
- Danvikens kyrka
- Danvikshems kyrka, Nacka
- Daretorps kyrka
- Degeberga kyrka
- Degerfors kyrka
- Delsbo kyrka
- Den gode herdens kyrka
- Den himmelska Glädjens kapell vid Gratia Dei i Kristianstad
- Dikanäs kyrka
- Dillnäs kyrka
- Dimbo-Ottravads kyrka
- Dingtuna kyrka
- Djura kyrka
- Djurgårdskapellet, Gothenburg
- Djurgårdskyrkan, Stockholm
- Djurhults kapell
- Djurröds kyrka
- Djursdala kyrka
- Djursholms kapell
- Djurö kyrka
- Djursdala kyrka
- Domsjö kyrka
- Donsö kyrka, Gothenburg
- Dorotea kyrka
- Dragsmarks kyrka
- Drevs gamla kyrka
- Drothem Church, Söderköping
- Drottningholm Palace Chapel
- Drängsereds kyrka
- Dunkers kyrka
- Duvbo kyrka
- Duveds kyrka
- Dädesjö gamla kyrka
- Dädesjö nya kyrka
- Döderhults kyrka
- Dörarps kyrka
- Dörby kyrka

== E ==
- Eda kyrka
- Edebo kyrka
- Edefors kyrka
- Edestads kyrka
- Edhems kyrka
- Eds kyrka
  - Eds kyrka, Grums
  - Eds kyrka, Sollefteå
  - Eds kyrka, Upplands-Väsby
- Edsbergs kyrka
- Edsbergskyrkan
- Edsbro kyrka
- Edsele kyrka
- Edshults kyrka
- Edsleskogs kyrka
- Edsvära kyrka
- Edvardslundskyrkan
- Edåsa kyrka
- Eftra kyrka
- Egby kyrka
- Eggby kyrka
- Eggvena kyrka
- Ekbackskyrkan, Vingåker
- Ekby kyrka
- Eke kyrka
- Ekeby kyrka
  - Ekeby kyrka, Bjuv
  - Ekeby kyrka, Boxholm
  - Ekeby kyrka, Gotland
  - Ekeby kyrka, Närke
  - Ekeby kyrka, Östhammar
- Ekebyborna kyrka
- Ekensbergskyrkan, Solna
- Ekenässjöns kyrka
- Ekers kyrka
- Ekerö kyrka
- Ekeskogs kyrka
- Eks kyrka
- Ekshärads kyrka
- Eksjö kyrka
- Eksta kyrka
- Eldsberga kyrka
- Elimkyrkan
  - Elimkyrkan, Boden, Boden
  - Elimkyrkan, Stockholm, Stockholm
  - Elimkyrkan, Sundsvall, Sundsvall
- Elings kyrka
- Eljaröds kyrka
- Elleholms kyrka
- Emmaboda kyrka
- Emmislövs kyrka
- Endre kyrka
- Enebybergs kyrka
- Enebykyrkan, Enebyberg
- Eneryda småkyrka
- Engelbrektskyrkan, Stockholm
- Engelska kyrkan, Gothenburg, se Saint Andrew's Church
- Enköping-Näs kyrka
- Enskede kyrka, Stockholm
- Enslövs kyrka
- Envikens gamla kyrka
- Envikens nya kyrka
- Enångers gamla kyrka
- Enångers kyrka
- Enåsa kyrka
- Eriksbergs gamla kyrka
- Eriksbergs nya kyrka
- Eriksbergskyrkan
- Erikstads kyrka
- Eringsboda kyrka
- Ersbodakyrkan, Umeå
- Erska kyrka
- Ersta kyrka
- Ervalla kyrka
- Esarps kyrka
- Eskelhems kyrka
- Eskiltorps kyrka
- Eskilsäters kyrka
- Eslövs kyrka
- Essinge kyrka, Stockholm
- Essunga kyrka
- Estuna kyrka
- Etelhems kyrka
- Everlövs kyrka
- Evertsbergs kapell
- Everöds kyrka

== F ==
- Fagereds kyrka
- Fagerhults kapell
- Fagerhults kyrka
- Fagersta lillkyrka
- Falkenbergs kyrka
- Falkvikskyrkan, Sölvesborg
- Falsterbo kyrka
- Famnens kyrka, Stockholm
- Fannakyrkan
- Fardhems kyrka
- Farhults kyrka
- Faringe kyrka
- Farstorps kyrka
- Fasterna kyrka
- Fatmomakke kyrka
- Felestads kyrka
- Fellingsbro kyrka
- Femsjö kyrka
- Fide kyrka
- Figeholms kyrka
- Filborna kyrka, Helsingborg
- Filipstads kyrka
- Films kyrka
- Finja kyrka
- Finnekumla kyrka
- Finnerödja kyrka
- Finnträsks kyrka
- Finska kyrkan i Stockholm
- Finspångs Slottskapell
- Fiskebäckskils kyrka
- Fittja kyrka
- Fivelstads kyrka
- Fivlereds kyrka
- Fjelie kyrka
- Fjälkestads kyrka
- Fjällbacka kyrka
- Fjällsjö kyrka
- Fjärestads kyrka
- Fjärås kyrka
- Flakebergs kyrka
- Flemingsbergs kyrka, Stockholm
- Flemmingelands kapell
- Fleninge kyrka
- Flens kyrka
- Fleringe kyrka
- Flisby kyrka
- Fliseryds kyrka
- Flistads kyrka
  - Flistads kyrka, Östergötland
  - Flistads kyrka, Västergötland
- Flo kyrka
- Floby kyrka
- Floda kyrka
  - Floda kyrka, Dalarna
  - Floda kyrka, Södermanland
- Flymens kyrka
- Fläckebo kyrka
- Flädie kyrka
- Fogdö kyrka
- Fole kyrka
- Folkärna kyrka
- Follingbo kyrka
- Fornåsa kyrka
- Fors kapell
- Fors kyrka
  - Strängnäs stift
  - Gothenburgs stift
  - Härnösands stift
- Forsa kyrka
- Forsbacka kyrka
- Forsbrokyrkan, Arbrå
- Forsby kyrka
- Forsdalakyrkan
- Forserums kyrka
- Forshaga kyrka
- Forsheda kyrka
- Forshems kyrka
- Forshälla kyrka
- Forsmarks kyrka
- Forssa kyrka
- Forsviks kyrka
- Fosie kyrka, Malmö
- Foss kyrka
- Fotskäls kyrka
- Fredens kyrka, Sundbyberg
- Fredrika kyrka
- Fredriksbergs kyrka
- Fredriksdals kyrka
- Fredrikskyrkan, Karlskrona
- Fredsbergs kyrka
- Frenninge kyrka
- Fresta kyrka
- Fridene kyrka
- Fridhems gravkapell, Gothenburg
- Fridhems kyrka
- Fridhemskyrkan, Mora
- Fridlevstads kyrka
- Friels kyrka
- Friggeråkers kyrka
- Frikyrkan Tystberga, Tystberga
- Frillestads kyrka
- Frillesås kyrka
- Frinnaryds kyrka
- Fristads kyrka
- Fritsla kyrka
- Frostvikens kyrka
- Fru Alstads kyrka
- Frustuna kyrka
- Fruängens kyrka, Stockholm
- Fryele kyrka
- Frykeruds kyrka
- Fryksände kyrka
- Främmestads kyrka
- Frändefors kyrka
- Fröderyds kyrka
- Frödinge kyrka
- Fröjels kyrka
- Fröjereds kyrka
- Fröseke kapell
- Fröskogs kyrka
- Fröslunda kyrka
- Frösthults kyrka
- Frösunda kyrka
- Frösve kyrka
- Frösö kyrka
- Frötuna kyrka
- Fuglie kyrka
- Fullestads kyrka
- Fulltofta kyrka
- Fullösa kyrka
- Funbo kyrka
- Funäsdalens kyrka
- Furingstads kyrka
- Furubergskyrkan
- Furåsens kyrka, Gothenburg
- Furuby kyrka
- Furuhöjdskyrkan, Alunda
- Furuåsens kyrka
- Fuxerna kyrka
- Fyrunga kyrka
- Fågelbergskyrkan
- Fågelfors kyrka
- Fågeltofta kyrka
- Fågelö kapell
- Fåglums kyrka
- Fårö kyrka
- Fägre kyrka
- Fällfors kyrka
- Fänneslunda-Grovare kyrka
- Färeds kapell
- Färentuna kyrka
- Färgaryds kyrka
- Färgelanda kyrka
- Färila kyrka
- Färingtofta kyrka
- Färlövs kyrka
- Fässbergs kyrka
- Fölene kyrka
- Föllinge kyrka
- Föra kyrka
- Förkärla kyrka
- Förlanda kyrka
- Förlösa kyrka
- Förslövs kyrka

== G ==
- Gagnefs kyrka
- Galtströms kyrka
- Gamla kyrkan i Kävlinge
- Gamla Uppsala kyrka
- Gamleby kyrka
- Gammaliakyrkan, Umeå
- Gammalkils kyrka
- Gammalstorps kyrka
- Gammelgarns kyrka
- Gammelsäters kyrka
- Ganthems kyrka
- Garde kyrka
- Gargnäs kyrka
- Garniskonskyrkan, Karlsborg
- Garpenbergs kyrka
- Genarps kyrka
  - German Church, Gothenburg
  - German Church, Stockholm
- Gerums kyrka
- Gessie kyrka
- Gestads kyrka
- Gesäters kyrka
- Getinge kyrka
- Gideonsbergskyrkan, Västerås
- Gideå kyrka
- Gillberga kyrka
  - Sörmland
  - Värmland
- Gillisnuole lappkapell
- Gillstad kyrka
- Giresta kyrka
- Gislaveds kyrka
- Gislövs kyrka
- Gistads kyrka
- Gladhammars kyrka
- Gladsax kyrka
- Glanshammars kyrka
- Glava kyrka
- Glemminge kyrka
- Glimåkra kyrka
- Glommersträsk kapell
- Glostorps kyrka, Malmö
- Glumslövs kyrka
- Glömminge kyrka
- Glöstorpskyrkan, Gothenburg
- Gnarps kyrka
- Gnosjö kyrka
- Godegårds kyrka
- Gothems kyrka
- Gottröra kyrka
- Gottsunda kyrka
- Grangärde kyrka
- Granults kyrka
- Graninge kyrka
  - Värmdö
  - Ångermanland
- Granlo kyrka
- Granö kyrka
- Gratia Dei
- Grava kyrka
- Grebbestads kyrka
- Grebo kyrka
- Gredelbykyrkan, Knivsta
- Grevbäcks kyrka
- Grevegårdens kyrka, Gothenburg
- Grevie kyrka
- Gribbylunds kapell
- Grimetons kyrka
- Grimmareds kyrka
- Grimsås kyrka
- Grinneröds kyrka
- Grinstad kyrka
- Grisslehamns kapell
- Grolanda kyrka
- Grude kyrka
- Grums kyrka
- Grundsunda kyrka
- Grundsunds kyrka
- Grycksbo kyrka
- Gryta kyrka
- Gryteryds kyrka
- Grythyttans kyrka
- Grytnäs kyrka
- Gryts kyrka
  - Skåne
  - Sörmland
  - Östergötland
- Gråträsk kapell
- Grängesbergs kyrka
- Grängsbo lillkyrka
- Gränna kyrka
- Gräsgårds kyrka
- Gräshagskyrkan
- Gräsmarks kyrka
- Grästorps kyrka
- Gräsvikens kapell
- Gräsö kyrka
- Gräve kyrka
- Grödinge kyrka
- Grönahögs kyrka
- Grönby kyrka
- Gröndals kyrka, Stockholm
- Grötlingbo kyrka
- Gualövs kyrka
- Gudhems kyrka
- Gudmundrå kyrka
- Gudmundstorps kyrka
- Guldhedens småkyrka, Gothenburg
- Guldrupe kyrka
- Guldsmedshyttans kyrka
- Gullabo kyrka
- Gullereds kyrka
- Gullholmens kyrka
- Gullängets kyrka
- Gumlösa kyrka
- Gunnareds kyrka, Gothenburg
- Gunnarps kyrka
- Gunnarsbyns kyrka
- Gunnarsjö kyrka
- Gunnarskogs kyrka
- Gunnarsnäs kyrka
- Gunnilbo kyrka
- Gustaf Adolfskyrkan, Stockholm
- Gustaf Vasa kyrka, Stockholm
- Gustafs kyrka
- Gustav Adolf Church
  - Borås
  - Helsingborg
  - Habo Municipality
  - Sundsvall
  - Viby
  - Värmland
- Gustav III:s kyrka, Ramsberg
- Gustavsbergs kyrka
- Gylle kyrka
- Gyllenfors kapell
- Gånghesters kyrka
- Gårdeby kyrka
- Gårdsby kyrka
- Gårdstens kyrka, Gothenburg
- Gårdstånga kyrka
- Gåsborns kyrka
- Gåsinge kyrka
- Gåxsjö kyrka
- Gällareds kyrka
- Gällaryds kyrka
- Gällersta kyrka
- Gällinge kyrka
- Gällivare gamla kyrka
- Gällivare kyrka
- Gällstads kyrka
- Gärdhems kyrka
- Gärdnäs kapell
- Gärdslösa kyrka
- Gärdserums kyrka
- Gärdslösa kyrka
- Gärdslövs kyrka
- Gödelövs kyrka
- Gödestads kyrka
- Gökhems kyrka
- Görslövs kyrka
- Gösslunda kyrka
- Götalundens kyrka
- Gothenburgs domkyrka, Gothenburg
- Götene kyrka
- Göteryds kyrka
- Göteve kyrka
- Götlunda kyrka
  - Arboga
  - Västergötland

== H ==
- Habo kyrka
- Habo Mission Covenant Church
- Hablingbo kyrka
- Haga kyrka
- Hagabergs kapell
- Hagakyrkan
  - Hagakyrkan, Borlänge
  - Hagakyrkan, Gothenburg
  - Hagakyrkan, Markaryd
  - Hagakyrkan, Sundsvall
  - Hagakyrkan, Örebro
- Hagalunds kyrka
- Hallaröds kyrka
- Hallundakyrkan, Norsborg
- Hamburgsunds kapell
- Hammarby kyrka, Eskilstuna
- Hammarby kyrka, Uppland
- Hammarbykyrkan, Stockholm
- Hammarkullens kyrka, Gothenburg
- Hammarlunda kyrka
- Hammarlövs kyrka
- Hammenhögs kyrka
- Hamra kyrka
- Hamrånge kyrka
- Hannas kyrka
- Hanhals kyrka
- Harakers kyrka
- Hardeberga kyrka
- Harlösa kyrka
- Hassle-Bösarps kyrka
- Havstenssunds kapell
- Haverö kyrka
- Heda kyrka, Ödeshög
- Hedareds stavkyrka
- Hedemora kyrka
- Hedvig Eleonora kyrka, Stockholm
- Hedvigs kyrka, Norrköping
- Hejdeby kyrka
- Helena Elisabeths kyrka
- Helgeandskyrkan, Lund
- Helga Trefaldighets kyrka, Uppsala
- Helgesta kyrka
- Heliga Kors kyrka, Ronneby
- Heliga Trefaldighets kyrka, Kristianstad
- Heliga Trefaldighetskyrkan, Malmö
- Hemsjö Church
- Hillareds kyrka
- Hjortensbergskyrkan, Nyköping
- Hjorthagens kyrka, Stockholm
- Hjortsberga kyrka
- Hjällbo kyrka, Gothenburg
- Hjälmseryds gamla kyrka
- Hjärtums kyrka
- Hofterups kyrka
- Holms kyrka
- Hosjö kyrka
- Huaröds kyrka
- Huddinge kyrka
- Hults kyrka
- Hultsfreds kyrka
- Husaby kyrka
- Husby kyrka
- Husie kyrka, Malmö
- Hyby gamla kyrka
- Hyby kyrka
- Hyllie kyrka, Malmö
- Hyllinge småkyrka
- Hyltinge kyrka
- Hyssna gamla kyrka
- Hyssna kyrka
- Håby kyrka
- Hålanda Church
- Håle-Tängs kyrka
- Hålta kyrka
- Håslövs kyrka
- Håstads kyrka
- Hägerstads gamla kyrka
- Hägerstads kyrka
- Häggeby kyrka
- Häggenkyrkan, Oxelösund
- Hällaryds kyrka
- Hälleberga kyrka
- Hällestads kyrka
- Hälsingtuna kyrka
- Häradshammars kyrka
- Härkeberga kyrka
- Härlanda kyrka, Gothenburg
- Härlanda kyrkoruin, Gothenburg
- Härnösands domkyrka
- Härryda kyrka
- Härslövs kyrka
- Hässelby Strands kyrka, Stockholm
- Hässelby Villastads kyrka, Stockholm
- Hässleby kyrka, Mariannelund
- Hässlunda kyrka
- Hästveda kyrka
- Högalidskyrkan, Stockholm
- Höganäs kyrka
- Högbergskyrkan, Ludvika
- Högbo kyrka
- Högdalskyrkan, Bandhagen
- Högs kyrka
  - Högs kyrka, Hälsingland
  - Högs kyrka, Skåne
- Högsbo kyrka, Gothenburg
- Hököpings kyrka
- Hölö kyrka
- Höreda kyrka
- Hörröds kyrka
- Hörups kyrka
- Höörs kyrka
- Hedeskoga kyrka, Ystad
- Högestads kyrka, Ystad
- Högåskyrkan, Tibro

== I ==
- Idre kyrka
- Igelösa kyrka
- Iggesunds kyrka
- Immanuel Church
  - Immanuel Church, Gävle
  - Immanuel Church, Jönköping
  - Immanuel Church, Stockholm
  - Immanuel Church, Trelleborg
- Ingatorps kyrka
- Ingelstorps kyrka
- Iskyrkan i Jukkasjärvi
- Ivetofta kyrka

== J ==
- Jakobs kyrka, Stockholm
- Jakobsbergskyrkan, Järfälla
- Johannebergkyrkan, Gothenburg
- Johanneskyrkan
- Saint John the Baptist's Church, Landskrona (defunctional building, outdoor ceremonies only)
- Jonsbergs kyrka, Vikbolandet
- Jordbro kyrka
- Josephina kyrka, Färingtofta
- Jukkasjärvi kyrka
- Jumkil kyrka
- Järfälla kyrka
- Järlåsa kyrka
- Järpås kyrka
- Järrestads kyrka
- Järsnäs Church
- Järvsö Church
- Jättendals kyrka

== K ==
- Kaga kyrka
- Kaitum kapell
- Kallinge kyrka
- Kalmar domkyrka
- Kalmar kyrka
- Kalvträsks kyrka
- Kanalkyrkan, Sandviken
- Karaby kyrka
- Kareby kyrka
- Karesuando kyrka
- Karls kyrkoruin
- Karlsdals kapell
- Karlskoga kyrka
- Karlstads domkyrka
- Karlstorps kyrka
- Kastalakyrkan, Kungälv
- Kastlösa kyrka
- Katarina kyrka, Stockholm
- Katslösa kyrka
- Kattarps kyrka
- Kattnäs kyrka
- Kaverös kyrka, Gothenburg
- Kiaby kyrka
- Kilanda kyrka
- Kimstads kyrka
- Kinne-Vedums kyrka
- Kinneveds kyrka
- Kirsebergs kyrka, Malmö
- Kiviks kapell
- Kiruna kyrka
- Kisa kyrka
- Kista kyrka, Stockholm
- Kjula kyrka
- Klara kyrka, Stockholm - se Sankta Clara kyrka
- Klockrike kyrka
- Klosters kyrka
- Klädesholmens kyrka
- Klövedals kyrka
- Klöveskogs kapell
- Klövsjö kyrka
- Knivsta gamla kyrka
- Knutby kyrka
- Knäbäckskapellet
- Knästorps kyrka
- Kolmårdskyrkan
- Konga kyrka
- Konungsunds kyrka
- Korsbackakyrkan
- Kortedalakyrkan
- Kristbergs kyrka
- Kristdala kyrka
- Kristianopels kyrka
- Kristina kyrka
- Kristine Church, Falun
- Kristine Church, Sala
- Kristinedalskyrkan
- Kristinehamns kyrka
- Kristofferkyrkan, Karlshamn
- Krokeks kyrka
- Krokstad kyrka
- Krylbo kyrka
- Kråkshults kyrka
- Kråksmåla kyrka
- Kräklingbo kyrka
- Krämarekapellet
- Kuddby kyrka
- Kulla kyrka, Uppland
- Kullerstads kyrka
- Kullings-Skövde kyrka
- Kullkyrkan
- Kumla kyrka, Närke
- Kumla kyrka, Västmanland
- Kumla kyrka, Östergötland
- Kumlaby kyrka, Visingsö
- Kummelby kyrka
- Kungsholms baptistkyrka, Stockholm
- Kungsholms kyrka, Stockholm
- Kungsladugårds kyrka, Gothenburg
- Kungslena kyrka
- Kungsmarkskyrkan
- Kungälvs kyrka
- Kvarsebo kyrka
- Kverrestads kyrka
- Kvidinge kyrka
- Kviinge kyrka
- Kville kyrka
- Kvillinge kyrka
- Kvistbro kyrka
- Kvistofta kyrka
- Kyrkefalla kyrka, Tibro
- Kyrkheddinge kyrka
- Kyrkhults kyrka
- Kyrkoköpinge kyrka
- Kåge kyrka
- Kågedalens kyrka
- Kågeröds kyrka
- Kållereds kyrka
- Kårsta kyrka
- Källa ödekyrka
- Källartorpskyrkan, Dala-Järna
- Källby kyrka
- Källeryds kyrka
- Källs-Nöbbelövs kyrka
- Källstads kyrka
- Källstorps kyrka
- Källunge kyrka
- Kärda kyrka
- Käringöns kyrka
- Kärlekens kyrka, Halmstad
- Kärna kyrka
- Kärra kapell, Gothenburg
- Kättilstads kyrka
- Köpings kyrka, Öland

== L ==
- Lackalänga kyrka
- Lammhults kyrka
- Landalakapellet, Gothenburg
- Landeryds kyrka
- Landskyrkan, Alingsås
- Lagmansereds kyrka
- Laholms kyrka, se Sankt Clemens kyrka
- Landa kyrka, Kungsbacka
- Lannaskede gamla kyrka
- Lannaskede-Myresjö kyrka
- Lannavaara kyrka
- Latiksbergs kyrka
- Lavads kyrka
- Leksand Church
- Lena kyrka, Uppsala stift
- Lerums kyrka
- Lextorpskyrkan
- Lidakyrkan, Västerhaninge
- Lidingö kyrka
- Lilla Harrie kyrka
- Lillkyrkan, Motala
- Lillkyrkan & Columbariet, Stockholm
- Lillmokyrkan, Malung
- Limhamns kyrka, Malmö
- Linderöds kyrka
- Lindesbergs kyrka
- Linköpings domkyrka, Linköping
- Linnékyrkan, Gothenburg
- Linnékyrkan, Limhamn
- Listerby kyrka
- Ljungarum Church, Jönköping
- Ljungkyrkan, Höllviken
- Ljusdals kyrka
- Ljusets kyrka
- Ljusterö kyrka
- Lockarps kyrka, Malmö
- Locknevi kyrka
- Lomma kyrka
- Loshults kyrka
- Luleå domkyrka
- Lundby kyrka, Västerås
- Lundby gamla kyrka, Gothenburg
- Lundby nya kyrka, Gothenburg
- Lunds Allhelgonakyrka, se Allhelgonakyrkan, Lund
- Lunds domkyrka, Lund
- Lungsunds kyrka, Storfors, Värmland
- Lurs kyrka
- Lutherska Missionskyrkan
  - Lutherska Missionskyrkan, Borås
  - Lutherska Missionskyrkan, Gothenburg
- Lyckebokyrkan, Storvreta
- Lyngby kyrka
- Lysekils kyrka
- Långared Church
- Långelanda kyrka
- Långlöts kyrka
- Långshyttans kyrka
- Längbro kyrka
- Länsmansgårdens kyrka, Gothenburg
- Löderups kyrka
- Lödöse (gamla) kyrka, see Sankt Peders kyrka
- Lögdö kyrka
- Lönnbergskyrkan, Bergsjö
- Lönneberga kyrka
- Lösens kyrka
- Lötenkyrkan
- Lövgärdets kyrka, Gothenburg

== M ==
- Maglarps kyrka
- Maglarps nya kyrka
- Malexander Church
- Malå kyrka
- Malma kapell
- Malma kyrka
- Mangskogs kyrka
- Maria Magdalena kyrka
  - Maria Magdalena kyrka, Lund
  - Maria Magdalena kyrka, Stockholm
- Mariakyrkan, se även Sankta Maria kyrka nedan
  - Mariakyrkan, Boden
  - Mariakyrkan, Brönnestad
  - Mariakyrkan, Båstad
  - Mariakyrkan, Danderyd
  - Mariakyrkan, Eskilstuna
  - Mariakyrkan, Frösön
  - Mariakyrkan, Gråmanstorp
  - Mariakyrkan, Gävle
  - Mariakyrkan, Gothenburg
  - Mariakyrkan, Halmstad
  - Mariakyrkan, Helsingborg
  - Mariakyrkan, Katrineholm
  - Mariakyrkan, Lidköping
  - Mariakyrkan, Ljungby
  - Mariakyrkan, Sigtuna
  - Mariakyrkan, Skogås
  - Mariakyrkan, Umeå
  - Mariakyrkan, Värnamo
  - Mariakyrkan, Växjö
- Mariebergs gravkapell, Gothenburg
- Marieholmskyrkan, Mariestad
- Mariedalskyrkan, Karlskrona
- Mariehälls kyrka, Stockholm
- Mariestads domkyrka
- Maria Magdalena kyrka, Stockholm
- Maria Magdalena kyrka, Lund
- Markims kyrka
- Markuskyrkan, Stockholm
- Marstrands kyrka, Kungälv
- Marsvinsholms kyrka
- Martebo kyrka
- Martin Luther Church (Halmstad)
- Masthuggskyrkan, Gothenburg
- Masugnsby kyrka
- Matteus kyrka
  - Matteus kyrka, Norrköping
- Mellan-Grevie kyrka
- Mellanhedskapellet, Malmö
- Mellby kyrka
- Mellösa Church, Flen
- Mikaelikyrkan
  - Mikaelikyrkan, Arvika
  - Mikaelikyrkan, Skärholmen
- Mikaelskyrkan, Gothenburg
- Mikaelskyrkan, Uppsala
- Mikaelskapellet, Stockholm
- Minneskyrkan, Frillesås
- Missionskyrkan
  - Missionskyrkan, Alfta
  - Missionskyrkan, Alvesta
  - Missionskyrkan, Arboga
  - Missionskyrkan, Bjursås
  - Missionskyrkan, Björklinge
  - Missionskyrkan, Björnlunda
  - Missionskyrkan, Bollnäs
  - Missionskyrkan, Edsbyn
  - Missionskyrkan, Falun
  - Missionskyrkan, Furulund
  - Missionskyrkan, Garda
  - Missionskyrkan, Gävle (Hille)
  - Missionskyrkan, Götlunda (i Arboga)
  - Missionskyrkan, Hallstahammar
  - Missionskyrkan, Harbo
  - Missionskyrkan, Heby
  - Missionskyrkan, Hedesunda
  - Missionskyrkan, Hemse
  - Missionskyrkan, Hjortsberga
  - Missionskyrkan, Hudiksvall
  - Missionskyrkan, Hässleholm
  - Missionskyrkan, Insjön
  - Missionskyrkan, Knislinge
  - Missionskyrkan, Lammhult
  - Missionskyrkan, Lagan
  - Missionskyrkan, Leksand
  - Missionskyrkan, Ljungby
  - Missionskyrkan, Malmköping
  - Missionskyrkan, Mockfjärd
  - Missionskyrkan, Moheda
  - Missionskyrkan, Möklinta
  - Missionskyrkan, Mölnbo
  - Missionskyrkan, Ockelbo
  - Missionskyrkan, Orsa
  - Missionskyrkan, Osby
  - Missionskyrkan, Rättvik
  - Missionskyrkan, Sala
  - Missionskyrkan, Slätthög
  - Missionskyrkan, Stjärnhov
  - Missionskyrkan, Söderhamn
  - Missionskyrkan, Södertälje
  - Missionskyrkan, Tyringe
  - Missionskyrkan, Tärnsjö
  - Missionskyrkan, Uppsala
  - Missionskyrkan, Valbo
  - Missionskyrkan, Vallby
  - Missionskyrkan, Vikingstad
  - Missionskyrkan, Vinslöv
  - Missionskyrkan, Visby
  - Missionskyrkan, Växjö
  - Missionskyrkan, Älmhult
  - Missionskyrkan, Östervåla
- Mo kyrka, Bohuslän
- Mogata kyrka
- Molla kyrka
- Mosjö kyrka
- Motala kyrka
- Multrå kyrka
- Munkegärdekyrkan, Kungälv
- Munkhagskyrkan, Mariefred
- Munsö kyrka
- Muskö kyrka
- Månkarbokyrkan, Månkarbo
- Mälarhöjdens kyrka, Stockholm
- Märsta kyrka
- Mölle kapell
- Mölleberga kyrka
- Mörarps kyrka
- Mörbylånga kyrka
- Mörkö kyrka

== N ==
- Nacka kyrka
- Nacksta kyrka
- Naverstads kyrka
- Nederluleå kyrka = ("Gammelstads kyrka")
- Nedre Ulleruds kyrka
- Nevishögs kyrka
- Nianfors kyrka
- Nikkaluokta kapell
- Njurunda kyrka, Njurunda
- Njutångers kyrka
- Nols kyrka
- Noltorp Church
- Nordingrå kyrka
- Nordmalings kyrka
- Norra Björke kyrka
- Norra Mellby kyrka
- Norra Nöbbelövs kyrka
- Norra Skrävlinge kyrka
- Norra Vrams kyrka
- Norra Åkarps kyrka
- Norrby Church
- Norrmalmskyrkan, Stockholm
- Nornäs kapell
- Norrfors kyrka
- Norrstrandskyrkan, Karlstad
- Norrsunda kyrka
- Norrtälje kyrka
- Norrvidinge kyrka
- Norums kyrka
- Nosaby Church
- Nossebro kyrka
- Nybro kyrka
- Nylöse kyrka, Gothenburg
- Nysunds kyrka, Åtorp
- Näsby kyrka
  - Kalix
  - Kristianstad
  - Lindesberg
  - Vetlanda
- Näsbyparks kyrka
- Näsets kyrka, Gothenburg
- Näshults kyrka
- Näsums kyrka
- Nättraby kyrka

== O ==
- Obbola kyrka
- Odalkyrkan, Kristianstad
- Odarslövs kyrka
- Odensala kyrka
- Odenslundskyrkan, Östersund
- Olaus Petri kyrka, Stockholm
- Olivehällkyrkan, Strängnäs
- Onsala kyrka
- Onslunda kyrka
- Orkesta kyrka
- Orsa Church
- Osby kyrka
- Oscarskyrkan, Stockholm
- Oscar Fredriks kyrka, Gothenburg
- Ovansjö kyrka
- Ovanåkers kyrka
- Oxie kyrka, Malmö
- Öxnehaga Church, Huskvarna

== P ==
- Pajala kyrka
- Pater Nosterkyrkan, Gothenburg
- Pauluskapellet, Uppsala
- Pelarne kyrka
- Persnäs kyrka
- Petersgårdens kyrka
- Pilgrimskyrkan, Sveg
- Pentecost Church
  - Pentecost Church, Jönköping
  - Pentecost Church, Kalmar
  - Pentecost Church, Märsta

== R ==
- Ramdala Church
- Ramkvilla Church
- Ramsberg Church
- Ramsåsa Church
- Ramundeboda Church, Laxå
- Rannebergen Church, Gothenburg
- Ransberg Church, Tibro
- Ransäter Church
- Rasbo Church
- Rasbokil Church
- Ravlunda Church
- Rebbelberga Church
- Rejmyre Church
- Resarö kapell
- Resmo Church
- Resö kapell
- Revinge Church
- Riddarholmen Church, Stockholm
- Risbro Church, Fagersta
- Rissne Church
- Riseberga Church
- Risekatslösa Church
- Risinge Old Church
- Risinge New Church
- Roden Church, Norrtälje
- Romfartuna Church
- Rommele Church
- Rosengård Church, Malmö
- Rosengård Church, Helsingborg
- Roslags-Kulla Church
- Royal Chapel, Stockholm
- Rudboda Church
- Runsten Church
- Rystad Church
- Rya Church, Frillesås
- Rya Church, Örkelljunga
- Rytterne Church
- Råda Church, Mölnlycke
- Rådmansö Church
- Råssnäs Church
- Råsunda Church
- Räng Church
- Räpplinge Church
- Rättvik Church
- Rödbo Church, Gothenburg
- Röddinge Church
- Rödeby Church
- Röke Church
- Rök Church
- Rönne Church, Ängelholm
- Rörum Church
- Rösereds kapell, Góthenburg

== S ==
- Sabbatsbergs kyrka, Stockholm
- Saint Andrew's Church, Gothenburg (Engelska kyrkan)
- Salabackekyrkan
- Sals kyrka
- Salem Church in Habo
- Salemkyrkan/Södermalms Baptistförsamling, Stockholm
- Salems kyrka
- Samariterhemmets kyrka, Uppsala
- Sandby
- Sandvikens kyrka
- Sankt Andreas kyrka, Malmö
- Sankt Ansgars kyrka, Uppsala
- Sankt Botvids kyrka
- Sankt Clemens kapell, Simrishamn
- Sankt Clemens kyrka, Laholm
- S:t Clemens kyrkoruin, Visby
- Sankt Eriks kapell, Stockholm
- S:t Eriks kyrka, Stockholm
- S:t Eskils kyrka, Stockholm
- Sankt Eskilskyrkan, Eskilstuna
- S:ta Gertruds kyrkoruin, Visby
- S:ta Gertruds Kyrka, Kungsbacka
- Sankt Görans kyrka, Stockholm
- S:t Görans kyrkoruin, Visby
- Sankt Hans kyrka, Linköping
- Sankt Hans kyrka, Lund
- S:t Hans och S:t Pers kyrkoruiner, Visby
- Sankt Ibbs kyrka Ven (ö)
- Sankt Jakobs kapell, Malmö
- Sankt Johannes kyrka
  - Järrestad
  - Gothenburg
  - Kalmar
  - Landskrona
  - Malmö
  - Norrköping
  - Stockholm
  - Skövde
  - Värnamo
- Sankta Katarina kyrkoruin, Visby
- Sankt Knuts kyrka
  - Lund
- Sankt Lars kyrka
  - Sankt Lars kyrka, Åsa, Halland
  - Sankt Lars kyrka, Linköping, Östergötland
- Sankt Laurentii kyrka, Falkenberg
- Sankt Laurentii kyrka, Lund
- S:t Laurentii kyrka, Söderköping
- S:t Lars kyrkoruin, Visby
- Sankt Matteus gravkapell, Gothenburg
- Sankt Matteus kyrka
  - Sankt Matteus kyrka, Malmö
  - Sankt Matteus kyrka, Skövde
  - Sankt Matteus kyrka, Stockholm
- Sankt Mikaels kyrka
  - Sankt Mikaels kyrka, Kulladal (Malmö)
- Sankt Mikaels kyrka, Malmö
- Sankt Mikaels kyrka, Södertälje
- S:t Mikaels kyrka, Visby
- Sankt Nicolai kyrka
  - Arboga
  - Halmstad
  - Lidköping
  - Nyköping
  - Simrishamn
  - Sölvesborg
  - Trelleborg
  - Sankt Nicolaus kyrkoruin, Visby
- S:t Olai kyrka, Norrköping
- Sankt Olofs kyrka
  - Sankt Olofs kyrka, Falköping
  - Sankt Olofs kyrka, Helsingborg
  - Sankt Olofs domkyrka i Sigtuna
  - Sankt Olofs kyrka, Täby
  - Sankt Olofs kyrka, Uppsala
  - Sankt Olofs kyrka, Österlen
  - S:t Olofs kyrkoruin, Visby
- Sankt Pauli kyrka
  - Gothenburg
  - Malmö
- Sankt Peders kyrka
- Sankt Pers kyrka
  - Sankt Pers kyrkoruin, Sigtuna.
  - Sankt Pers kyrka, Uppsala.
  - Sankt Pers kyrka, Vadstena.
- Sankt Peters Klosters kyrka, Lund
- Sankt Peterskyrkan, Stockholm
- Sankt Petri kyrka
  - Klippan
  - Malmö
  - Ystad
- Sankt Sigfrids kyrka
  - Nybro kommun
  - Stockholm
- Sankt Staffans kyrka
- Sankt Thomas kapell, Malmö
- Sankt Tomas kyrka, Stockholm
- S:t Trinitatis kyrkoruin, Visby
- Sankta Anna kyrka, Ramsberg
- Sankta Birgittas kapell, Gothenburg
- Sankta Birgitta kyrka, Kalmar
- S:ta Birgitta kyrka, Stockholm
- Sankta Clara kyrka, Stockholm
- Sankta Helena kyrka, Skövde
- Sankta Katarina kyrka, Malmö
- Sankta Maria kyrka
  - Borrby
  - Helsingborg
  - Lidköping
  - Malmö
  - Risinge
  - Uppsala
  - Ystad
  - Åhus
- Sankta Ragnhilds kyrka, Södertälje
- Saxdalens kapell
- Saxnäs kyrka
- Segeltorps kyrka
- Segerstads kyrka
- Seglora kyrka
- Seljansborgs kyrka
- Sidensjö kyrka
- Silbodals kyrka
- Silverdalskapellet
- Silvåkra kyrka
- Simris kyrka
- Sireköpinge kyrka
- Sjougdnäs kapell
- Själevads kyrka
- Sjömanskyrkan, Gothenburg
- Sjöstadskapellet, Stockholm
- Skabersjö kyrka
- Skaga stavkyrka
- Skallsjö kyrka
- Skanörs kyrka
- Skara domkyrka, Skara
- Skederids kyrka
- Skedevi kyrka
- Skee kyrka
- Skegrie kyrka
- Skellefteå landsförsamlings kyrka
- Skepparslövs kyrka
- Skepplanda kyrka
- Skeppsholmskyrkan
- Skillinge kapell
- Skivarps kyrka
- Skogs kyrka
- Skogshöjdens kyrka
- Skogsängskyrkan, Rönninge
- Skoklosters kyrka
- Skredsviks kyrka
- Skultuna kyrka
- Skurups kyrka
- Skuttunge kyrka
- Skålleruds kyrka
- Skårs kyrka, Gothenburg
- Skälbykyrkan, Runtuna
- Skällviks kyrka
- Skälvums kyrka
- Skärhamns kyrka
- Skärholmens kyrka, Stockholm
- Skönberga kyrka
- Sköns kyrka
- Skönsmons kyrka, Sundsvall
- Skörstorps kyrka
- Smedby kyrka
- Smedstorps kyrka
- Snavlunda kyrka
- Snårestads kyrka
- Snöstorps kyrka
- Sofia Albertina Church, Landskrona
- Sofia Church, Jönköping
- Sofia Church, Stockholm
- Solberga kyrka
  - Solberga kyrka, Bohuslän
  - Solberga kyrka, Skåne
  - Solberga kyrka, Västergötland
- Sollentuna kyrka
- Solna kyrka
- Sorbykyrkan, Köping
- Sorunda kyrka
- Sparlösa kyrka
- Spekeröds kyrka
- Spikarö kapell
- Spjutstorps kyrka
- Spånga kyrka, Stockholm
- Stadionkyrkan, Malmö
- Stadsökyrkan, Luleå
- Staffans kyrka, Gävle
- Stala kyrka
- Stampens gravkapell, Gothenburg
- Starrkärrs kyrka
- Stavby kyrka
- Stefanskyrkan, Stockholm
- Stehags kyrka
- Stenkumla kyrka
- Stenkvista kyrka
- Stenkyrka kyrka
  - Gotland
  - Bohuslän
- Stensele kyrka
- Stensjökyrkan
- Stenungsunds kapell
- Stenåsa kyrka
- Stiby kyrka
- Stjärnsunds kyrka
- Stockaryds kyrka
- Stockslyckekyrkan
- Stora Hammars gamla kyrka
- Stora Hammars kyrka
- Stora Harrie kyrka
- Stora Herrestads kyrka
- Stora Kopparbergs kyrka
- Stora Köpinge kyrka
- Stora Mellby kyrka
- Stora Råby kyrka
- Stora Skedvi kyrka
- Stora Tuna kyrka
- Storkyrkan, Stockholm
- Storkällans kapell
- Storsäterns kapell
- Strandkyrkan
  - Strandkyrkan, Burgsvik
  - Strandkyrkan, Lomma
- Strängnäs domkyrka
- Ströms kyrka
- Strömstads kyrka
- Stuguns gamla kyrka
- Stuguns nya kyrka
- Sturkö kyrka
- Stuvstakyrkan, Huddinge
- Styrsö kyrka, Gothenburg
- Stångby kyrka
- Stävie kyrka
- Stångby kyrka
- Stöde kyrka
- Sundborns kyrka
- Sundbybergs kyrka, Sundbyberg
- Sundre kyrka
- Sunne kyrka, Härnösands stift
- Sunnersta kyrka
- Suntaks gamla kyrka
- Svalövs kyrka
- Svarteborgs kyrka
- Svedvi kyrka
- Svegs kyrka
- Svenneby kyrka
- Svenneby gamla kyrka
- Svensköps kyrka
- Svenstakyrkan, Svenstavik
- Svenstorps kyrka
- Svärdsjö kyrka
- Sånga kyrka, Härnösands stift
- Sånga kyrka, Stockholms stift
- Säby kyrka
- Säbykyrkan, Salem
- Säbykyrkan, Åkersberga
- Säfsnäs kyrka
- Sälens fjällkyrka
- Särna Gammelkyrka
- Särna Kyrka
- Särslövs kyrka
- Säters kyrka, Västerås stift
- Sätila kyrka
- Sätra kyrka, Stockholm
- Sätunakyrkan, Märsta
- Säve kyrka, Gothenburg
- Sävja kyrka
- Söderala kyrka
- Söderbykarls kyrka
- Söderbärke kyrka
- Söderhöjdskyrkan, Stockholm
- Söderledskyrkan, Stockholm
- Södermalms Baptistförsamling/Salemkykan, Stockholm
- Södertälje sjukhuskyrka
- Södervidinge kyrka
- Södra Biskopsgårdens kyrka
- Södra Kedums kyrka
- Södra Mellby kyrka
- Södra Möckleby kyrka
- Södra Råda gamla kyrka
- Södra Sallerups kyrka, Malmö
- Södra Sandby kyrka
- Södra Vi kyrka
- Södra Åkarps kyrka
- Södra Åsums gamla kyrka
- Södra Åsums kyrka
- Söne kyrka
- Sövde kyrka
- Sövestads kyrka, Ystad

== T ==
- Tabernaklet, Gothenburg
- Tacksägelsekyrkan, Trångsund
- Tanums kyrka
- Taxinge kyrka
- Tegneby kyrka
- Tegs kyrka
- Tensta kyrka, Vattholma
- Tenstakyrkan, Tensta
- Tibble kyrka
- Tierps kyrka
- Timrå kyrka
- Tingstads kyrka
- Tingstäde kyrka
- Tingsås kyrka
- Tirups kyrka
- Tjolöholms kyrka, Kungsbacka
- Tofta kyrka, Gotland
- Tomelilla kyrka
- Torestorps kyrka, Mark
- Toresunds kyrka
- Tornehamns kapell
- Torrlösa kyrka
- Torshälla kyrka
- Torskinge kyrka
- Torslunda
- Torsångs kyrka
- Tosterups kyrka
- Tottarps kyrka
- Toleredskyrkan, Gothenburg
- Torslanda kyrka, Gothenburg
- Transtrands kyrka
- Tranås kyrka
- Trefaldighetskyrkan
  - Trefaldighetskyrkan, Arvika
  - Trefaldighetskyrkan (Karlskrona)
- Triangle Church, Enskede
- Karlskrona
- Trollbäckens kyrka
- Trollhättans kyrka
- Tryde kyrka
- Träne kyrka
- Trökörna kyrka
- Tumbo kyrka
- Tun kyrka
- Tuna kyrka
- Tunabergskyrkan
- Tunadalskyrkan, Köping
- Tunge kyrka
- Tuolluvaara kyrka
- Tureholmskyrkan, Sösdala
- Turinge kyrka
- Tuve kyrka, Gothenburg
- Tveta kyrka, Södertälje kommun
- Tveta kyrka, Hultsfreds kommun
- Tveta kyrka, Säffle kommun
- Två systrars kapell, Kalmar
- Tynnereds kyrka, Gothenburg
- Tyngsjö kyrka
- Tygelsjö kyrka, Malmö
- Tyresö kyrka
- Tåby kyrka
- Täby kyrka
- Tämta kyrka
- Tångeråsa kyrka

== U ==
- Ubbhults kapell
- Ullstorps kyrka
- Ulrika-Eleonora kyrka, Ludvika
- Undenäs kyrka
- Umeå stads kyrka, Umeå
- Undersviks kyrka
- Uppåkra kyrka
- Uppenbarelsekyrkan, Hägersten
- Uppenbarelsekyrkan, Saltsjöbaden
- Upphärads kyrka
- Uppsala domkyrka
- Utby kyrka, Gothenburg
- Utvängstorp Church, Mullsjö Municipality

== V ==
- Vada Church
- Vaksala Church, Uppsala
- Valbo Church
- Vallakyrkan, Handen
- Vallby Church, Eskilstuna
- Vallby Church, Skåne
- Vallda Church
- Valleberga Church
- Vallentuna Church
- Vallersvikskyrkan, Frillesås
- Vallkärra Church
- Valsätrakyrkan, Uppsala
- Vantörs kyrka, Stockholm
- Varnhems kyrka
- Vasakyrkan
  - Vasakyrkan, Gothenburg
  - Vasakyrkan, Hedemora
  - Vasakyrkan, Kalmar
  - Vasakyrkan, Umeå
- Vaxholm Church
- Veberöds kyrka
- Vedevågs kyrka
- Vellinge Church
- Vena Church
- Vendels kyrka
- Vendelsö Church
- Ventlinge Church
- Verums kyrka
- Vesene Church
- Vickleby Church
- Vika Church
- Vikingstads kyrka
- Vikmanshyttans kyrka
- Vilunda Church
- Vimmerby Church
- Vindelns kyrka
- Vindhemskyrkan S:ta Birgitta
- Vinnerstads kyrka
- Virestads kyrka
- Virke Church
- Virserums kyrka
- Visnums kyrka
- Visnums-Kils kyrka
- Visseltofta Church
- Vitaby Church
- Vittangi Church
- Vittskövle Church
- Vombs kyrka
- Voxna Church
- Vreta klosterkyrka
- Vännäs Church
- Vilhelmina Church
- Visby domkyrka
- Vrångö Church, Gothenburg
- Vånga Church, Skåne
- Vånga Church, Östergötland
- Vårby gård Church
- Vårdkasekyrkan, Järfälla
- Vårdsberg Church
- Vårfrukyrkan, Gothenburg
- Välinge Church
- Välluvs kyrka
- Väne Åsaka kyrka
- Väne Ryrs kyrka
- Västanfors Church
- Västerkyrkan, Lund
- Västerledskyrkan, Enköping
- Västerledskyrkan, Stockholm
- Västerortskyrkan, Vällingby
- Västerportkyrkan, Kalmar
- Västerslättskyrkan, Umeå
- Västerstrandskyrkan, Karlstad
- Västerås domkyrka
- Västra Broby Church
- Västra Frölunda Church, Gothenburg
- Västra Gerum Church
- Västra Hoby Church
- Västra Husby Church
- Västra Ingelstad Church
- Västra Karaby Church
- Västra Klagstorp Church, Malmö
- Västra Nöbbelöv Church
- Västra Sallerup Church
- Västra Skrävlinge Church, Malmö
- Västra Strö Church
- Västra Tommarp Church
- Västra Tunhem Church
- Västra Vemmenhög Church
- Västra Vemmerlöv Church
- Västra Vram Church
- Vätö Church
- Växjö Cathedral

== Y ==
- Ysane kyrka
- Ytterby kyrka
- Ytterby gamla kyrka
- Ytterenhörna kyrka
- Yttergrans kyrka
- Ytterlännäs gamla kyrka
- Ytterselö kyrka

== Å ==
- Å kyrka
- Åbybergskyrkan, Vallentuna
- Åbylundskyrkan
- Ådalskyrkan
  - Ådalskyrkan, Gnesta
  - Ådalskyrkan, Kramfors
- Åkerby kyrka
- Åkersberga kyrka
- Ålands kyrka
- Ålems kyrka
- Ålidhemskyrkan
- Åmsele Kyrka
- Åmåls kyrka
- Åre Old Church
- Ås kyrka
- Åsele kyrka
- Åsenhöga kyrka
- Åsljunga kyrka

== Ä ==
- Älvdalens kyrka, Älvdalen
- Älvsborgs fästningskyrka, Gothenburg
- Älvsborgs kyrka, Gothenburg
- Älvsjökyrkan, Älvsjö
- Älvängens kyrka
- Ängby kyrka, Stockholm
- Ängelholms kyrka
- Ängskyrkan
- Ärentuna kyrka
- Äsphults kyrka
- Äspinge kyrka
- Ättetorpskyrkan

== Ö ==
- Öckerö gamla kyrka
- Öckerö nya kyrka
- Ödenäs kyrka
- Ödeshögs kyrka
- Ödsmåls kyrka
- Öhrs kyrka
- Öja kyrka, Ystad
- Öja kyrka, Gotland
- Öja kyrka, Småland
- Öja kyrka, Södermanland
- Öjaby kyrka
- Ökna kyrka
- Ölme kyrka
- Ölmevalla kyrka, Åsa, Halland
- Önnarps kyrka
- Önnestads kyrka
- Örgryte gamla kyrka, Gothenburg
- Örgryte nya kyrka, Gothenburg
- Örja kyrka
- Örkelljunga kyrka
- Örkeneds kyrka
- Örnsköldsviks kyrka
- Örnäsets kyrka
- Örserums kyrka
- Örsjö kyrka, Skåne
- Örsjö kyrka, Småland
- Örtomta kyrka
- Ösmo kyrka
- Össeby-Garns kyrka
- Össjö kyrka
- Östads kyrka
- Österhaninge kyrka
- Österledskyrkan, Uppsala
- Österkyrkan, Eslöv
- Österviks kapell
- Östervåla kyrka
- Österåkers kyrka
- Östra Fågelviks kyrka
- Östra Grevie kyrka
- Östra Herrestads kyrka
- Östra Hoby kyrka
- Östra Husby kyrka
- Östra Ingelstads kyrka
- Östra Karaby kyrka
- Östra Karups kyrka
- Östra Klagstorps kyrka
- Östra Kärrstorps kyrka
- Östra Ny kyrka
- Östra Nöbbelövs kyrka
- Östra Ryds kyrka, Uppland
- Östra Ryds kyrka, Östergötland
- Östra Strö kyrka
- Östra Sönnarslövs kyrka
- Östra Tommarps kyrka
- Östra Torps kyrka
- Östra Vemmenhögs kyrka
- Östra Vemmerlövs kyrka
- Östra Vrams kyrka
- Östra kyrkogården, Malmö
- Östra kyrkogårdskapellet, Gothenburg
- Östuna kyrka
- Öveds kyrka
- Överenhörna kyrka
- Övergrans kyrka
- Överjärna kyrka
- Överklintens kyrka
- Överluleå kyrka
- Överselö kyrka
- Övertorneå kyrka
- Övre Ulleruds kyrka
- Övraby kyrka
