= Örserum Church =

Coordinates: 58.0074°N 14.5730°E

- Örserums kyrka
- Örserum Church
- Location: Örserum
- Country: Sweden
- Denomination: Church of Sweden

Administration
- Diocese: Växjö
- Parish: Gränna

Örserum Church (Swedish: Örserums kyrka) is a church building at Örserum in Jönköping County, Sweden. It is situated along the road east of Gränna. The church is part of the Gränna Parish in the Diocese of Växjö the Church of Sweden. The church was completed in 1937 after drawings by architect Johannes Dahl (1886-1953).
