= Marstrand Church =

Coordinates: 57.8863°N 11.5829°E

- Marstrands kyrka
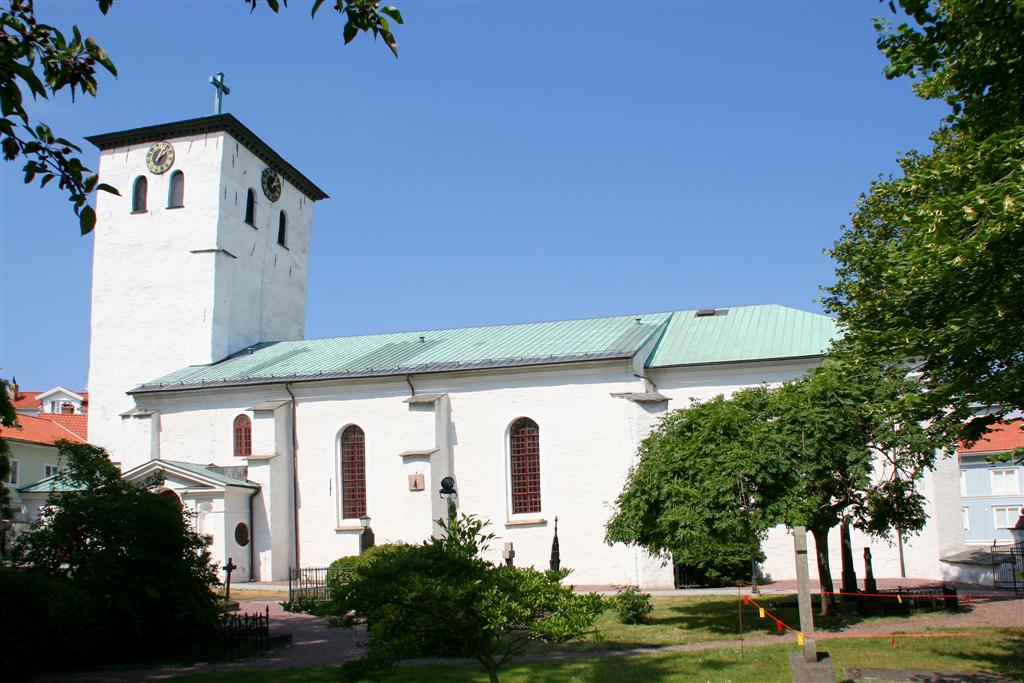
- Marstrand Church exterior in July 2006
- Marstrand Church
- Location: Marstrand
- Country: Sweden
- Denomination: Church of Sweden

History
- Consecrated: 14th century

Administration
- Diocese: Gothenburg
- Parish: Marstrand

The Marstrand Church (Swedish: Marstrands kyrka) is a church building in Marstrand, Sweden. It belongs to the Marstrand Parish of the Diocese of Gothenburg of the Church of Sweden.

== History ==
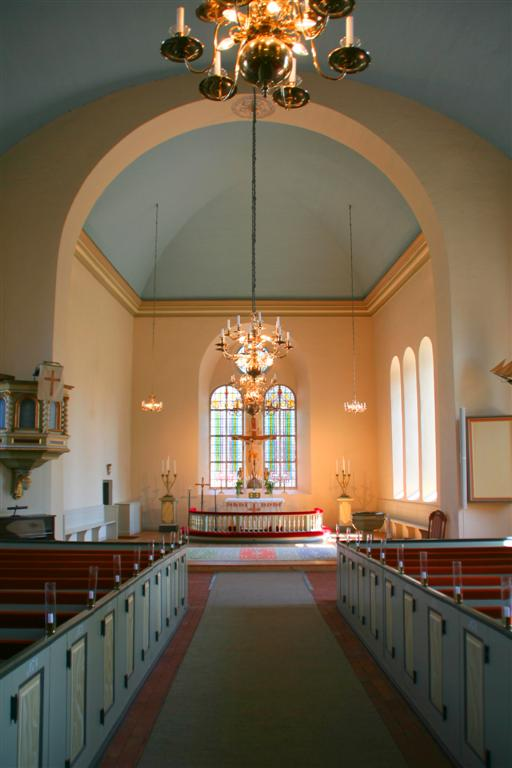
Marstrand Church, interior

The original church is believed to have been built of wood during the reign Harald Gille who was king of Norway from 1130 until his death in 1136. The current church was built of gray-washed natural stone between 1270 and 1319 and was probably a church for a Franciscan order. Major extensions and extensions were carried out in 1690, 1804 and 1807–1809. It was rebuilt in 1806 and renovated in 1912.

The pulpit is from 1691 and was built in baroque design. Rebuilding in 1852 has changed the pulpit into a more neoclassical style. An octagonal baptismal font with neoclassical design is made in 1912 after drawings by architect Ture Gabriel Schaar (1864-1945).
