= Östra Torp Church =

Coordinates: 55.3464°N 13.3569°E

- Östra Torps kyrka
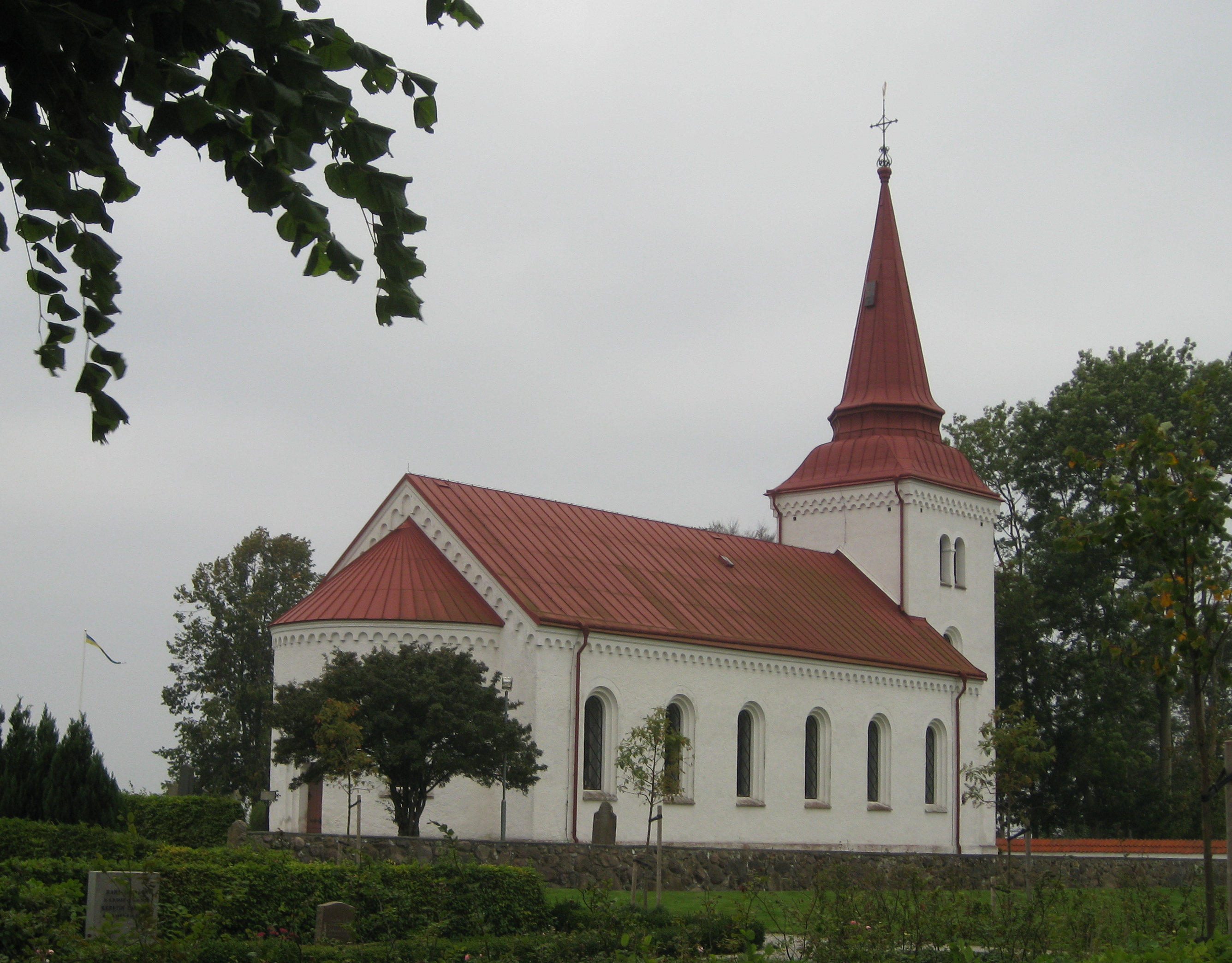
- Östra Torp Church in September 2010
- Östra Torp Church
- Location: Smygehamn
- Country: Sweden
- Denomination: Church of Sweden

History
- Consecrated: 14 June 1911

Architecture
- Architect: Theodor Wåhlin

Administration
- Diocese: Lund
- Parish: Källtorp

The Östra Torp Church (Swedish: Östra Torps kyrka) is a church building in Smygehamn, Sweden. Belonging to the Källtorp Parish of the Church of Sweden, it inaugurated on 14 June 1911. replacing an older church which had been destroyed by a 1909 fire. The church is the southernmost in Sweden.
