= Martin Luther Church (Halmstad) =

Coordinates: 56.6674°N 12.8809°E

- Martin Luthers kyrka
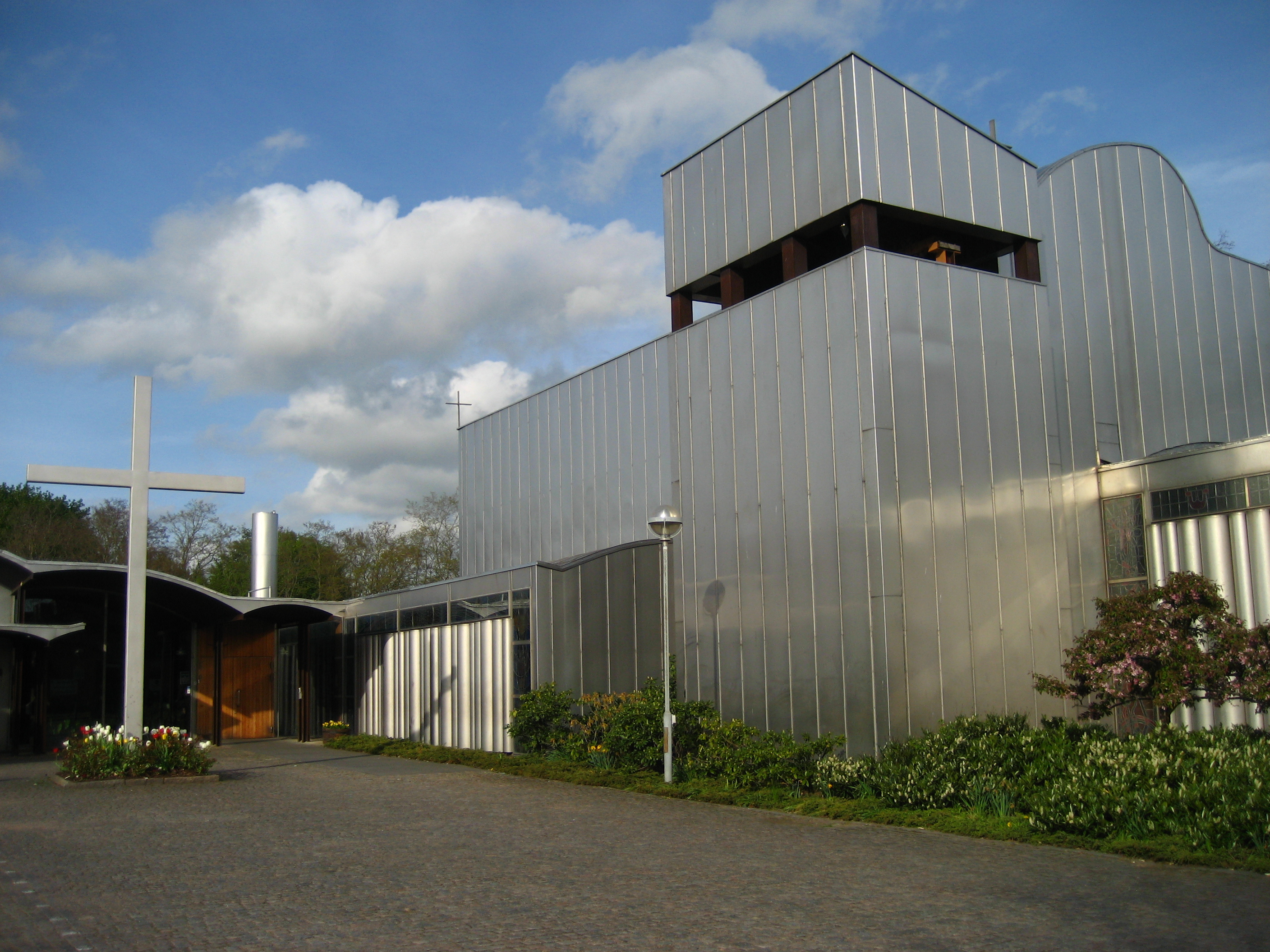
- Martin Luther Church
- Martin Luther Church
- Location: Halmstad
- Country: Sweden
- Denomination: Church of Sweden

History
- Consecrated: 19 December 1970

Architecture
- Groundbreaking: 13 December 1968

Administration
- Diocese: Gothenburg
- Parish: Martin Luther

The Martin Luther Church (Swedish: Martin Luthers kyrka) is a church building in Nyhem in Halmstad, Sweden. Belonging to the Martin Luther Parish of the Church of Sweden, it was opened on 19 December 1970.
