= Angerdshestra =

Village in Småland, Sweden

Coordinates: 57°40′08″N 13°54′12″E

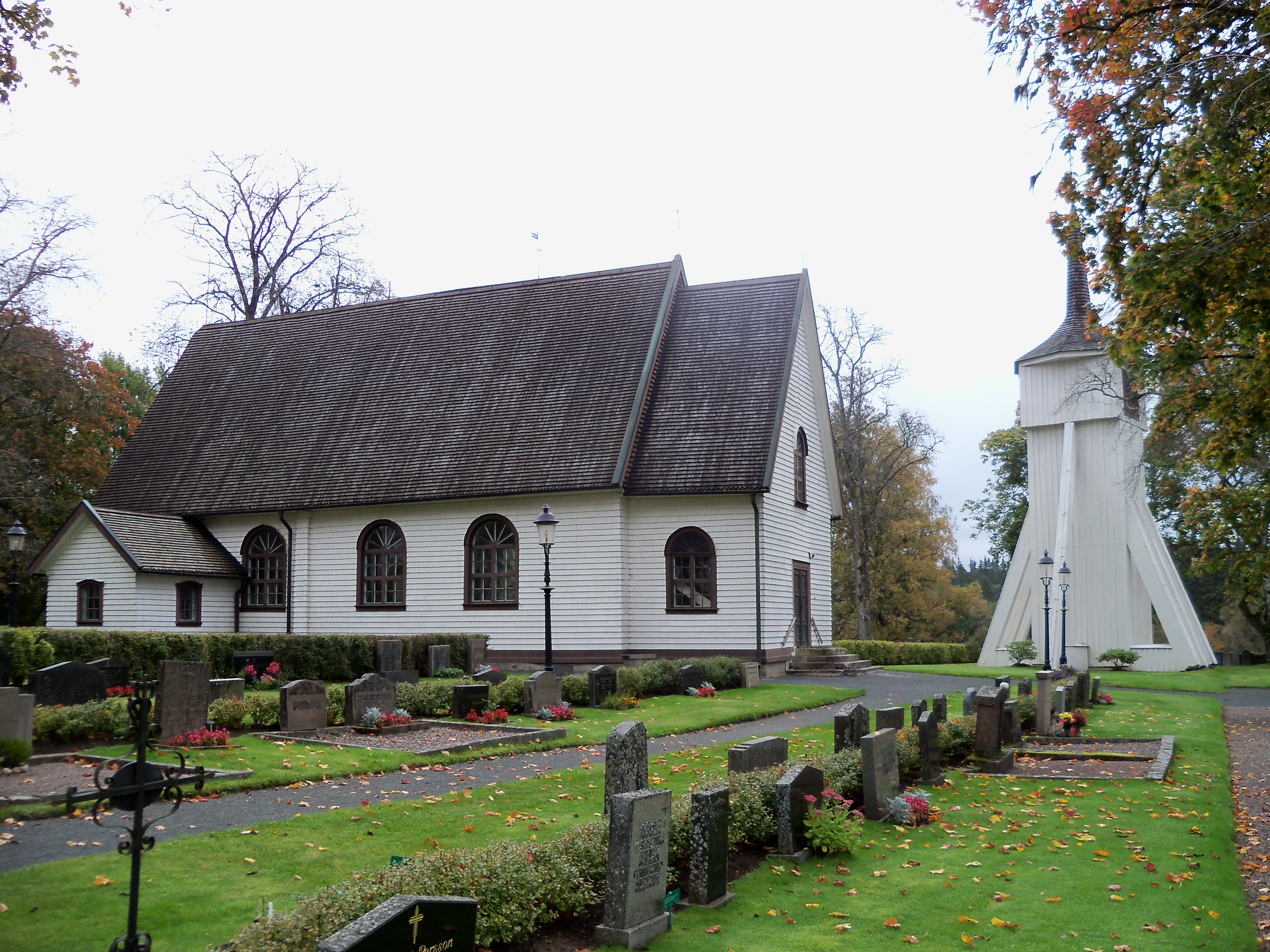
Angerdshestra Church

Angerdshestra (Swedish pronunciation: [ˈânːjæɖʂˌhɛsːtra]) is a village and former parish in Småland, Sweden. It is located in Jönköping Municipality, Jönköping County, Sweden. Angerdshestra is a woodland rich with moss around the Nissan river. In the parish there are about 80 ancient sites, mainly in smaller burial grounds with stone constructions of older Iron Age type.

Angerdshestra Church (Angerdshestra kyrka) was built of wood in 1669. Both the church exterior and roof are clad with wooden shingles. Adjacent to the church is a wooden bell tower which was built at that same time. The church was rebuilt in 1817 to the current three-sided choir. During a restoration in 1910, lumber from a previous wooden church was found from the early 1200s, partly with fragments of wall paintings from the early 1500s.
