= Bymarken Church =

Coordinates: 57.7911°N 14.1405°E

- Bymarkskyrkan
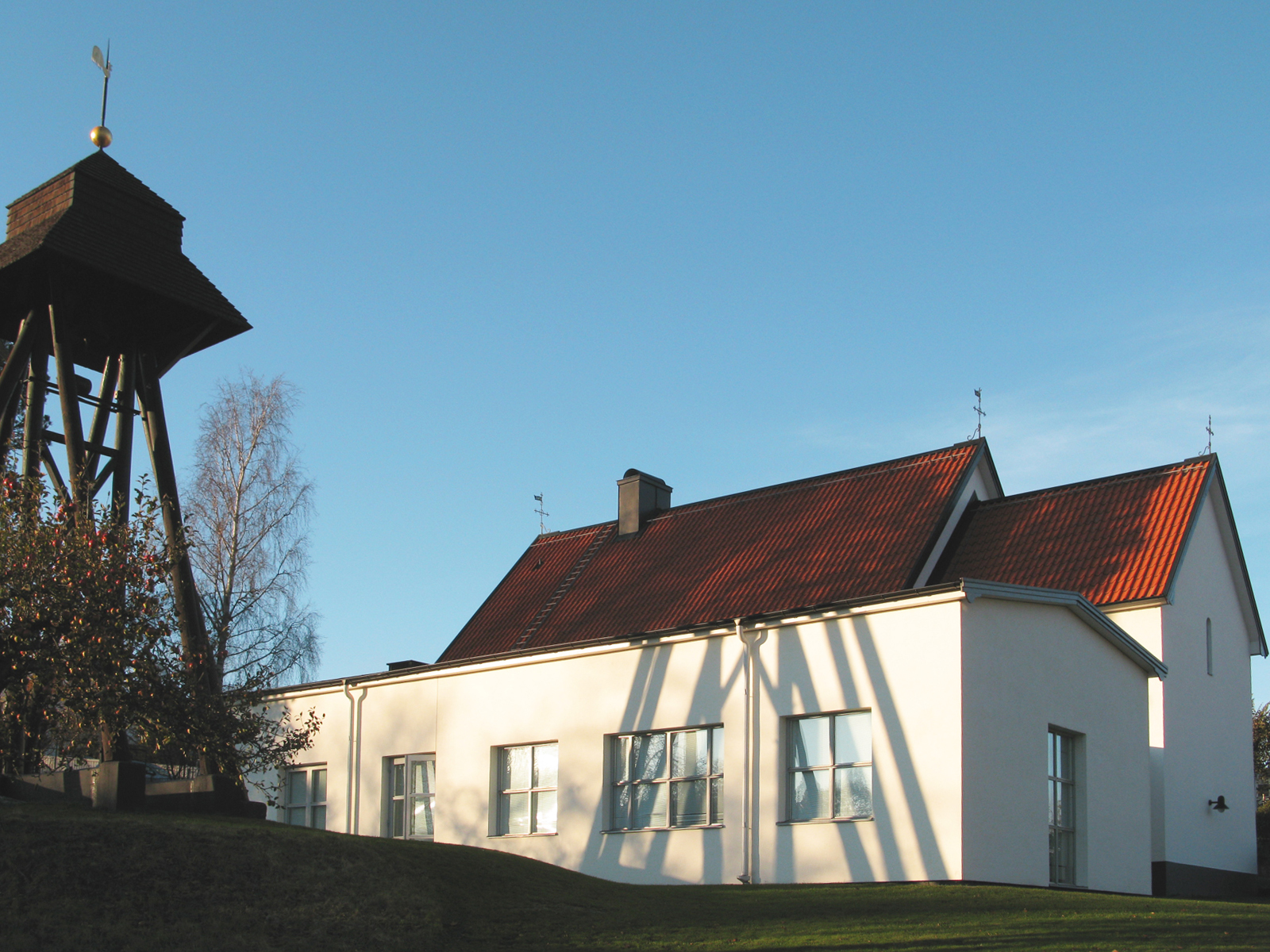
- The Bymarken Church in November 2008
- Bymarken Church
- Location: Bymarken
- Country: Sweden
- Denomination: Church of Sweden

History
- Consecrated: 1935

Administration
- Diocese: Växjö
- Parish: Jönköping Sofia-Järstorp

The Bymarken Church (Swedish: Bymarkskyrkan) is a church building at Bymarken in Jönköping, Sweden. Belonging to the Jönköping Sofia-Järstorp Parish of the Church of Sweden, it was opened in 1935.
