= Rejmyre Church =

Coordinates: 58°49′46″N 15°55′55″E

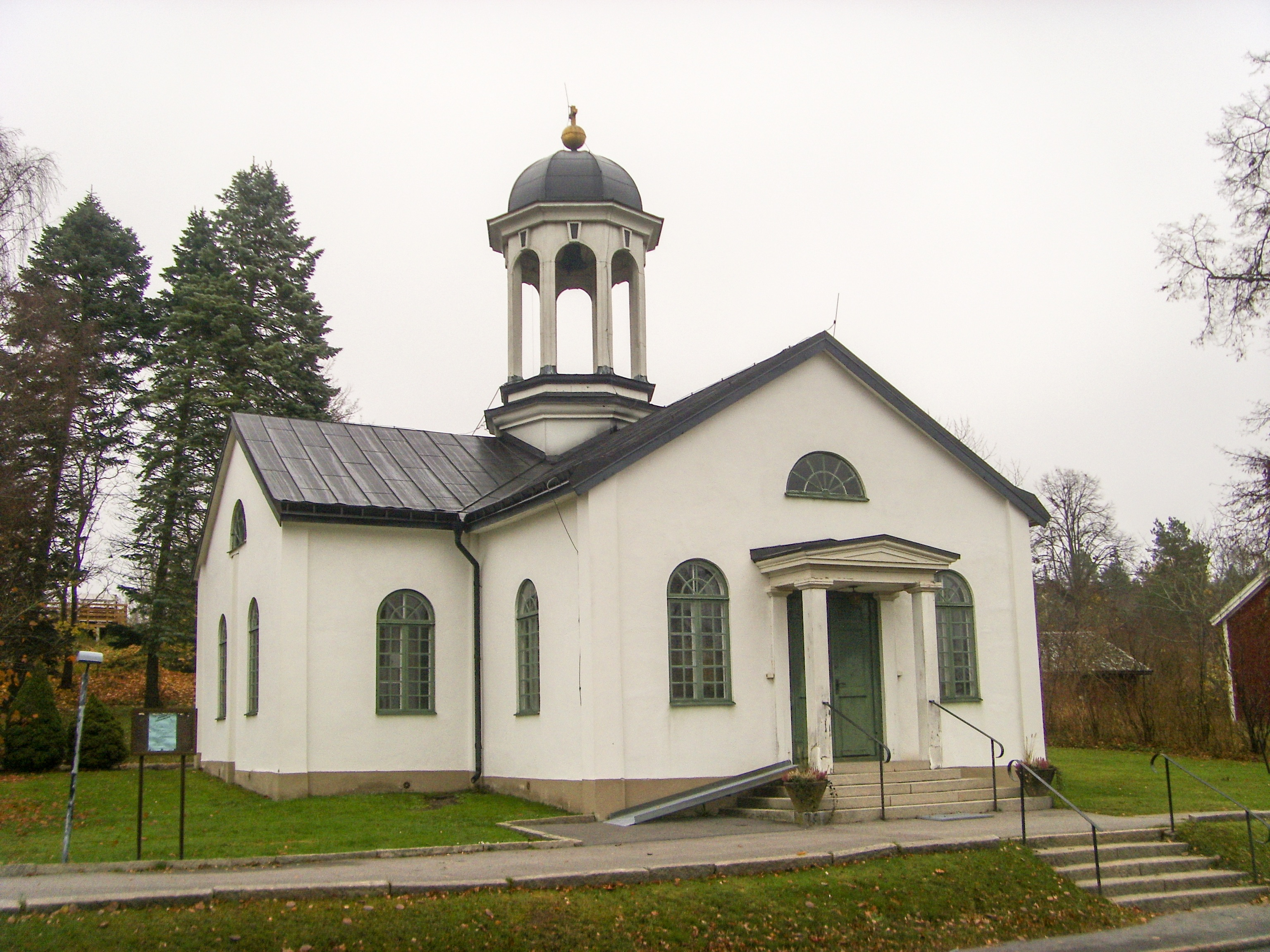
Rejmyre Church on October 30, 2008

Rejmyre Church (Swedish: Rejmyre kyrka) is a timber-built church, located in Rejmyre, Sweden, approximately 250 metres (820 ft) east of the Reijmyre glassworks and about 27 kilometres (17 mi) north of Finspång.

== History ==
When the construction of the Reijmyre glassworks began in 1810, the population of the village grew, and in 1837 the decision was made to build a chapel. The following year, a rectangular church building was erected on the present site.

During subsequent renovations, the interior of the church has been changed. In 1952, the pulpit above the altar was replaced by an ambon, placed in the left-hand side of the choir. Above the altar, an oil painting was added, which still remains.
