= Långared Church =

Church in Långared, Sweden

Coordinates: 58°2′40″N 12°31′11″E

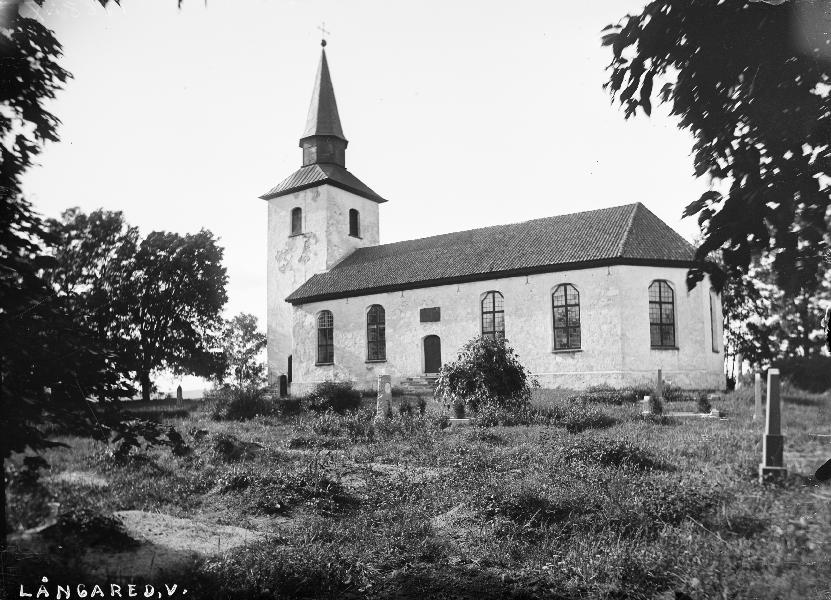
Långared Church

Långared Church (Swedish: Långareds kyrka) is a church in Långared, about 15 kilometres (9.3 mi) north of Alingsås in Västergötland, Sweden. It belongs to the parish of Bjärke parish in the Diocese of Skara. The church was consecrated on November 29, 1818, and replaced a medieval wooden church. The church tower was not completed until 1824. A pane of glass from the 16th century featuring weapons is preserved. The baptismal font, made of soapstone, is from the original church and dates to the 13th century. The present organ was built in 1937 by Nordfors of Lidköping, replacing an earlier organ installed in 1865.
