= Gustav Adolf Church =

Gustav Adolf Church may refer to:

- Gustav Adolf Church, Borås
- Gustav Adolf Church, Habo Municipality
- Gustav Adolf Church, Hagfors Municipality
- Gustav Adolf Church, Helsingborg
- Gustav Adolf Church, Iisalmi
- Gustav Adolf Church, Liverpool
- Gustav Adolf Church, Viby
- Gustav Adolf Church, Sundsvall
- Gustaf Adolf Church, Stockholm
- Gustav Adolf Church, Hamburg (German. Gustaf-Adolfs-Kirche)

== Other ==
- Gustav Adolf Chapel at Schwedenstein, Lützen
- Gustav Church
- Hartola Church (Fi. Hartolan kirkko, Sw: Gustav Adolfs kyrka)
- Karl Gustav Church

== See also ==
- Gustav Church (disambiguation)
- Gustav Adolf Parish
- Gustavus Adolphus
