= Cecilia Church =

Coordinates: 57.810833°N 14.154167°E

- Ceciliakyrkan
- Cecilia Church
- Location: Vilhelmsro
- Country: Sweden
- Denomination: Romanian Orthodox Church
- Previous denomination: Church of Sweden

History
- Consecrated: 1903

The Cecilia Church (Swedish: Ceciliakyrkan) a church building in Vilhelmsro outside Jönköping in Sweden. It was built in 1880–1881 as a church for the Vilhelmsro Nursing Home. It is named after Ebba Ramsay's youth friend Cecilia Willerding, and was opened in 1903 by Herman Lindström, bishop of Växjö. It later came under supervision by the Vicar of Jönköping, and was renovated in 1963. It later came under the Jönköping County Council, before it was transferred to municipal public housing company Vätterhem, who occasionally rent it out for worship services, including weddings.

In 2014 it was purchased by the Romanian Orthodox Church of Sweden.
