= Skepplanda Church =

Church in Nödinge-Nol, Vastergötland, Sweden

Coordinates: 57°59′11″N 12°12′50″E

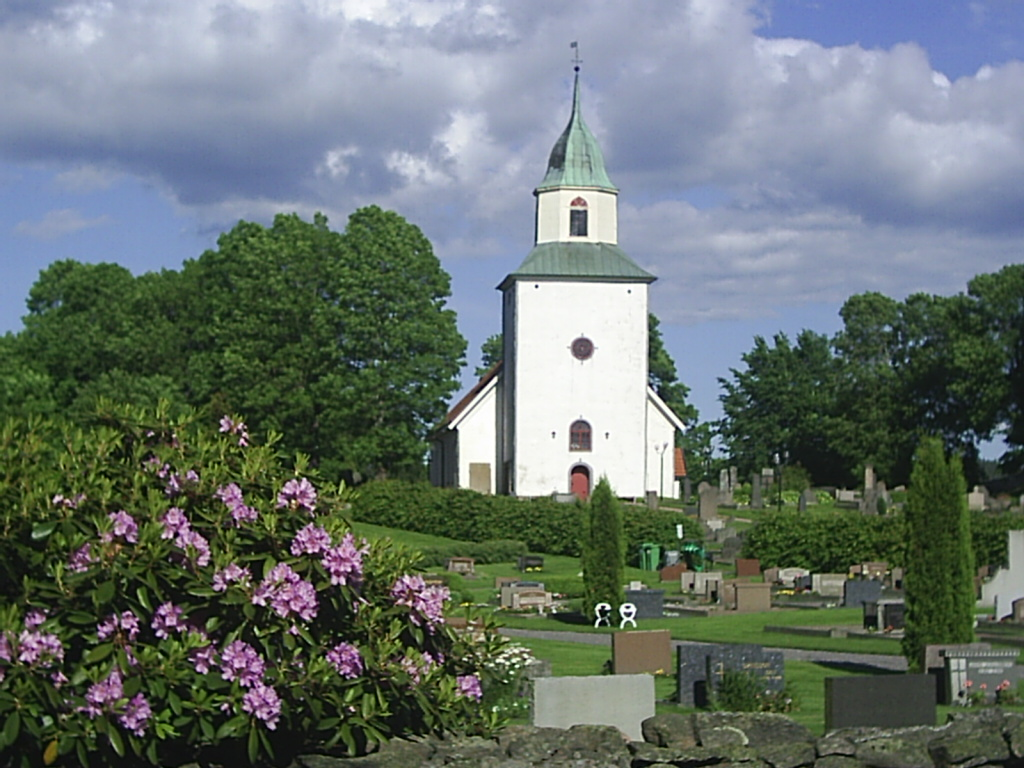
Skepplanda Church

Skepplanda Church (Swedish: Skepplanda kyrka) is a church in Nödinge-Nol, Västergötland, Sweden. It belongs to Skepplanda-Hålanda parish in the Diocese of Gothenburg. The present church building was begun in 1698 and was completed in 1705, partly built on the walls of the original church from the Middle Ages. The medieval church was largely destroyed by two storms in 1635 and 1674. The ceiling paintings, dating from 1770, were painted by Johan Burman. A church tower in the west was built 1753 and a porch to the south was added in 1756. The tower was destroyed in 1863 but rebuilt the following year. The baptismal font dates from the 13th century. The interior style is late baroque; the pulpit, altarpiece and baptismal font are the same age as the church's reconstruction.
