= Ljungarum Church =

Coordinates: 57.7550°N 14.1764°E

- Ljungarums kyrka
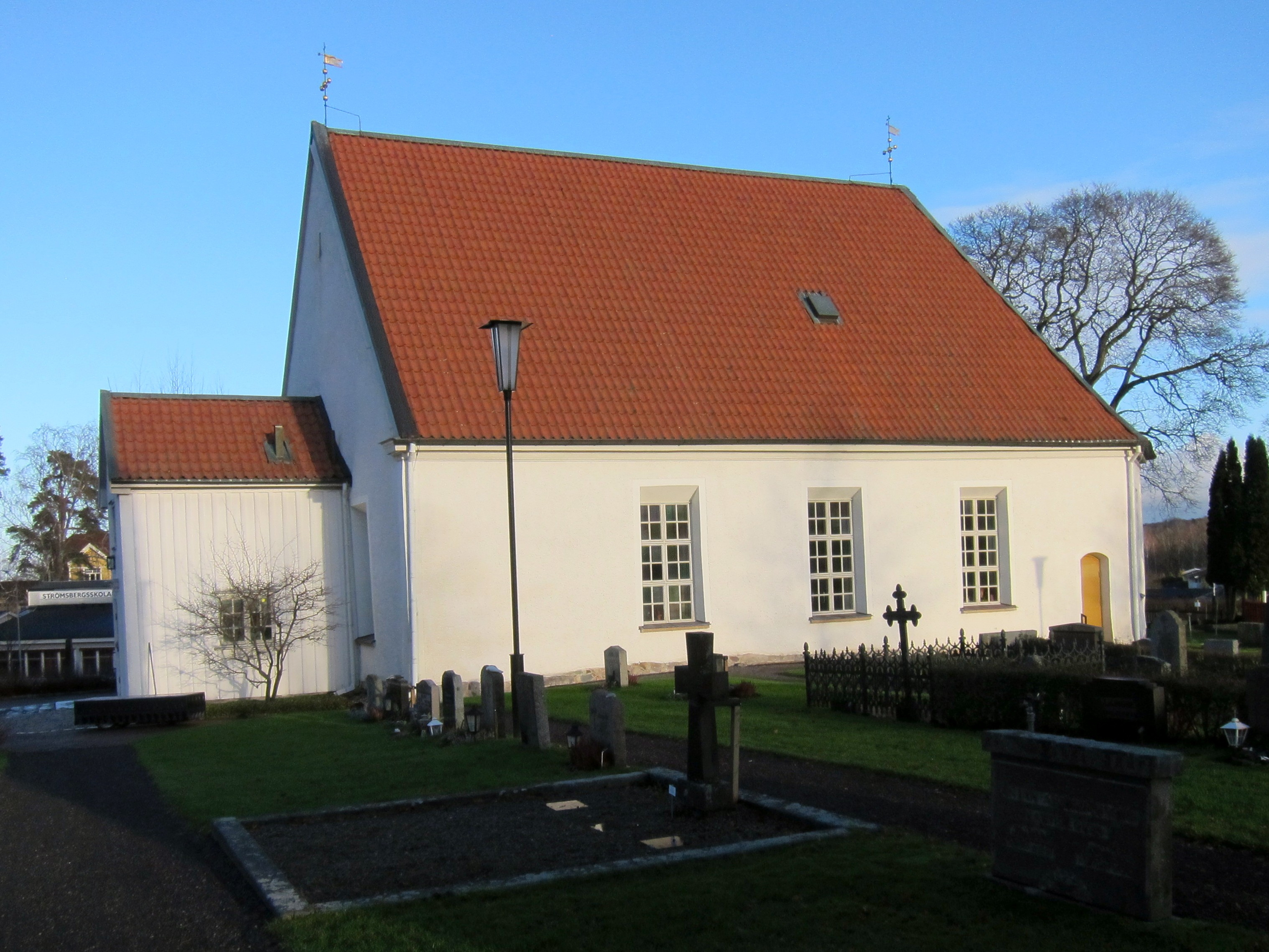
- Ljungarum Church in mid-December 2014
- Ljungarum Church
- Location: Ljungarum, Jönköping
- Country: Sweden
- Denomination: Church of Sweden

Administration
- Diocese: Växjö
- Parish: Jönköping Christina-Ljungarum

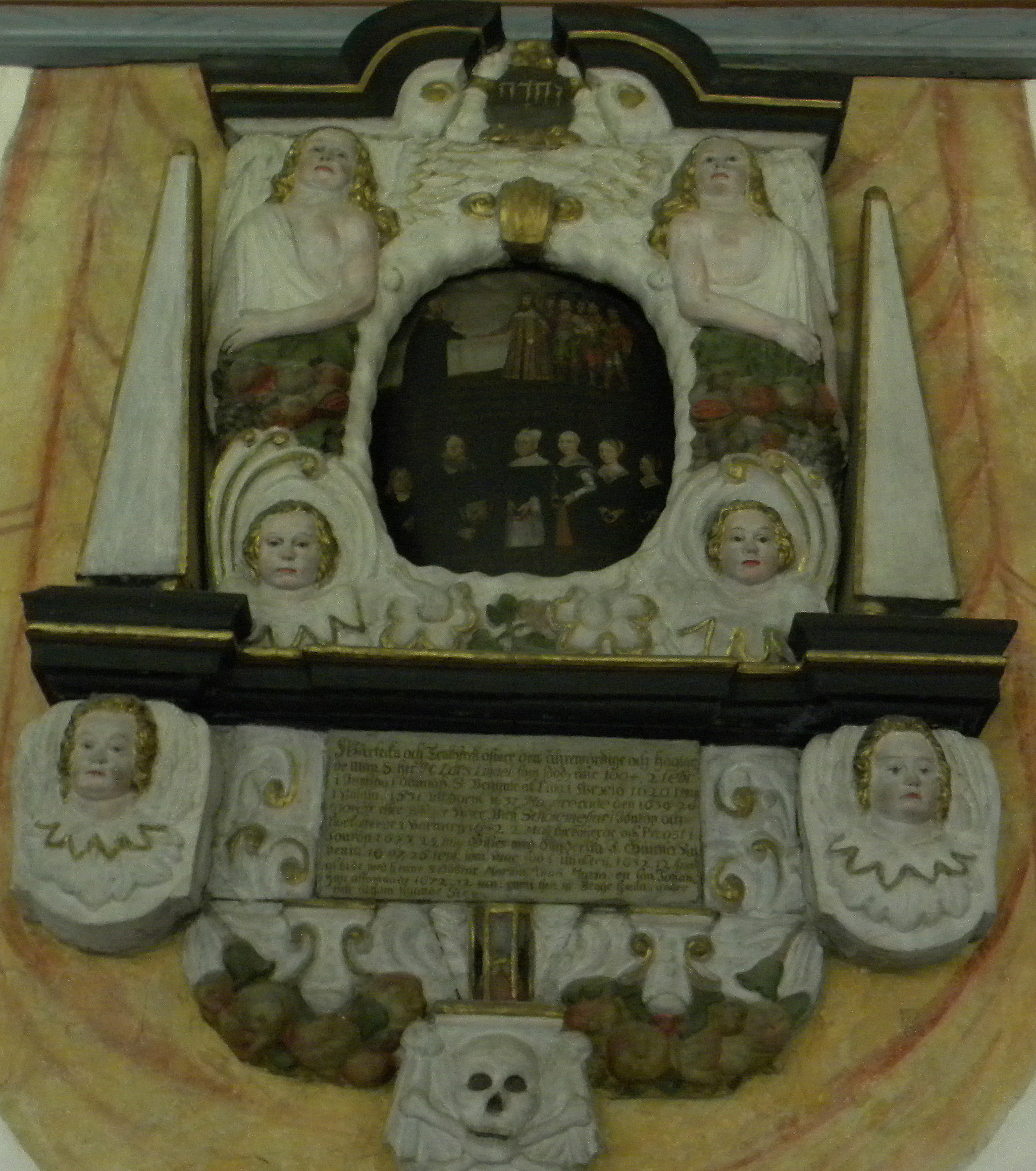
Inside Ljungarum Church

Ljungarum Church (Swedish: Ljungarums kyrka) is a church building in Jönköping in Sweden. It belongs to Jönköping Christina-Ljungarum Parish of the Church of Sweden. The building dates back to the 13th century.
