= Järsnäs Church =

Coordinates: 57.7762°N 14.5610°E

- Järsnäs kyrka
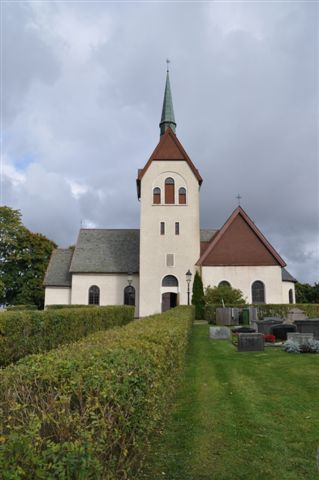
- Järsnäs Church
- Location: Järsnäs
- Country: Sweden
- Denomination: Church of Sweden

Administration
- Diocese: Växjö
- Parish: Lekeryd

Järsnäs Church (Swedish: Järsnäs kyrka) is a church building at the village of Järsnäs in Jönköping County, Sweden. It belongs to Lekeryd Parish in the Diocese of Växjö of the Church of Sweden. The medieval era church was restored in 1906 under the direction of architect August Atterström (1865-1930). It underwent additional restoration and modernization during 1937.

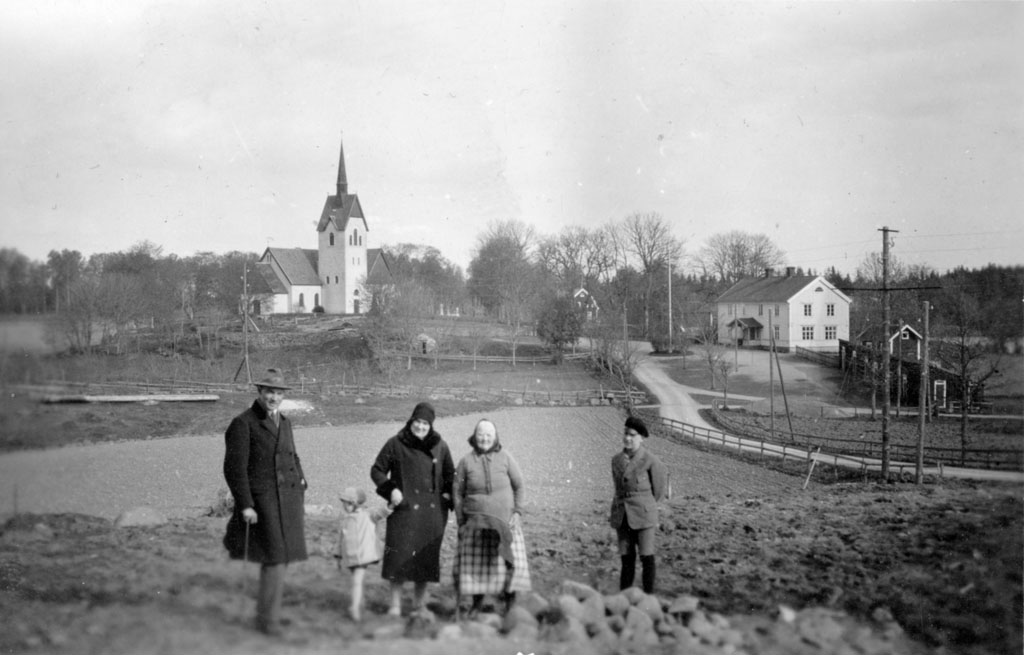
Family in 1920s with the Järsnäs Church in the background
