= Gällivare Church =

Coordinates: 67.1323°N 20.6594°E

- Gällivare kyrka
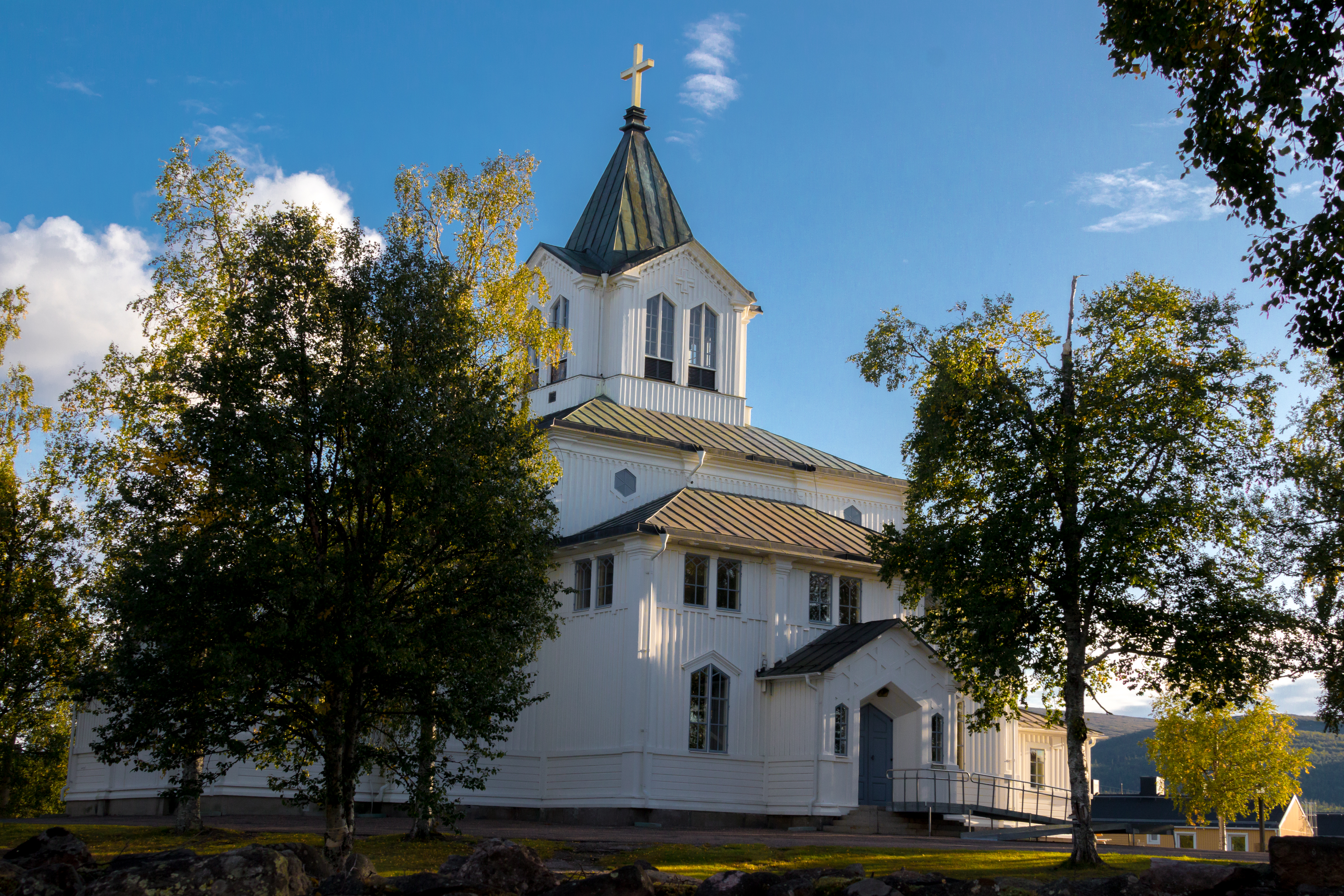
- Gällivare Church in August 2018
- Gällivare Church
- Location: Gällivare
- Country: Sweden
- Denomination: Church of Sweden

History
- Consecrated: February 1882

Administration
- Diocese: Luleå
- Parish: Gällivare

The Gällivare Church (Swedish: Gällivare kyrka) is a wooden church building in Gällivare, Sweden. Belonging to the Gällivare Parish of the Church of Sweden, it was inaugurated in February 1882, replacing an older church.
