= Röddinge Church =

- Röddinge kyrka
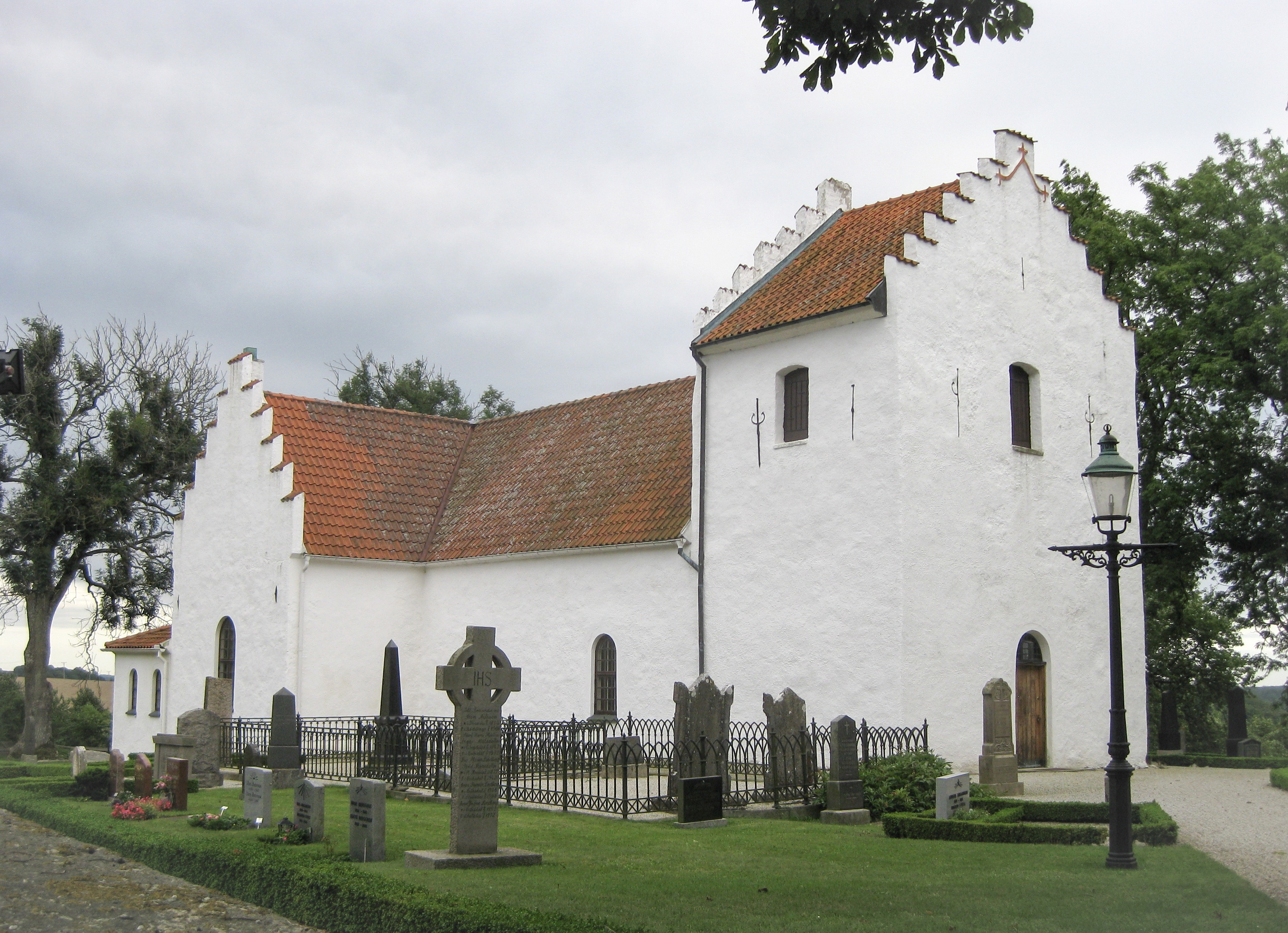
- Röddinge Church

- 55°34′58″N 13°49′59″E
- Country: Sweden
- Denomination: Church of Sweden

Röddinge Church (Swedish: Röddinge kyrka) is a medieval church in Röddinge, Sjöbo Municipality in the province of Skåne, Sweden.

== History and architecture ==
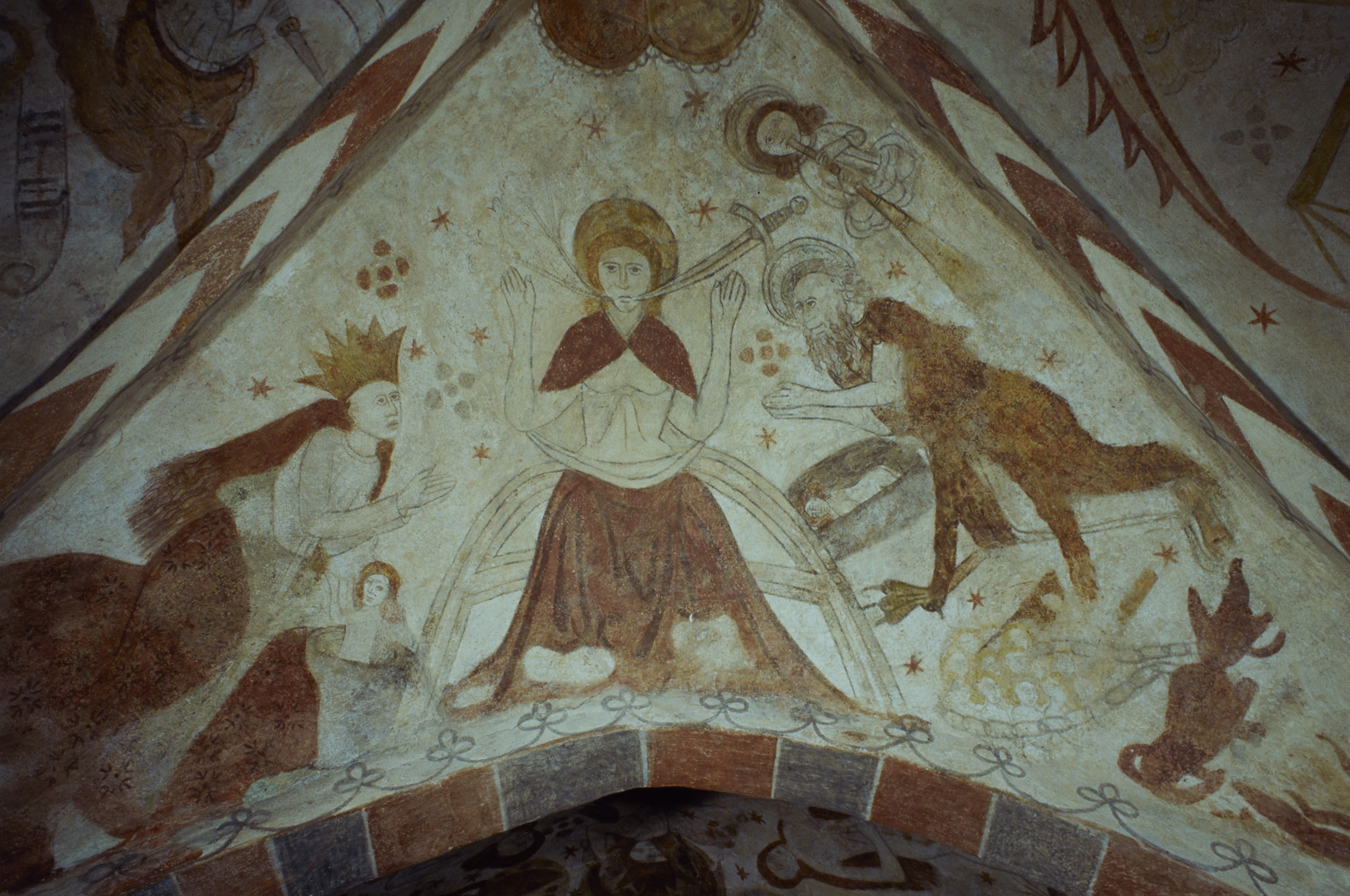
The Last Judgement, medieval mural in Röddinge Church

Röddinge Church dates from the late 12th century. The oldest parts are the nave and chancel. The tower, and probably also the church porch, date from the 15th century. During the 15th century the ceiling was also replaced by the currently visible vaults. The church was enlarged in 1877 by the addition of an apse and two transepts. New windows were also installed during the 19th century. The church was ravaged by fire in 1928 and subsequently restored.

The vaults of the nave are decorated with murals from the 15th and early 16th century, depicting scenes from the Bible. Originally the walls were also covered in murals, but these were mostly destroyed in the 19th century, when new windows were made. The baptismal font of the church dates from time of the church's construction and is decorated in a Romanesque style. The church bell is also medieval, from the 15th century. The pulpit and altarpiece are modern, dating from 1930.
