= Örserum =

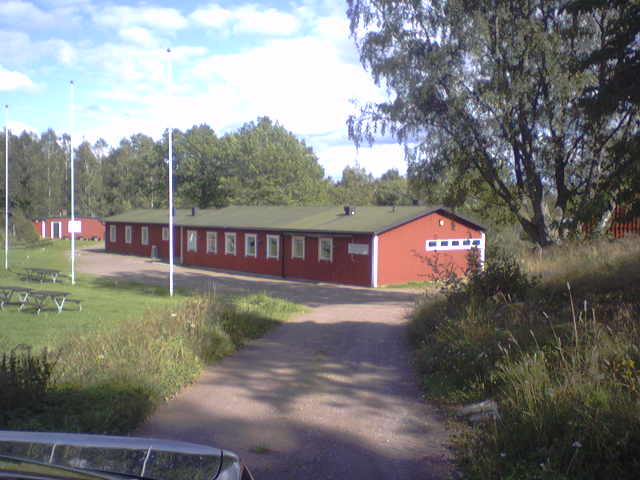
- Salvation Army Scout Association camp Högaberg, located off Örserum

- Location within Jönköping Location within Sweden
- Coordinates: 58°00′N 14°34′E
- Country: Sweden
- Province: Småland
- County: Jönköping County
- Municipality: Jönköping Municipality

Area
  - Total: 0.45 km^{2} (0.17 sq mi)

Population (31 December 2010)
  - Total: 322
  - Density: 713/km^{2} (1,850/sq mi)
- Time zone: UTC+1 (CET)
  - Summer (DST): UTC+2 (CEST)
- Climate: Dfb

Örserum is a locality situated in Jönköping Municipality, Jönköping County, Sweden with 322 inhabitants in 2010.
