= Risekatslösa Church =

- Risekatslösa kyrka
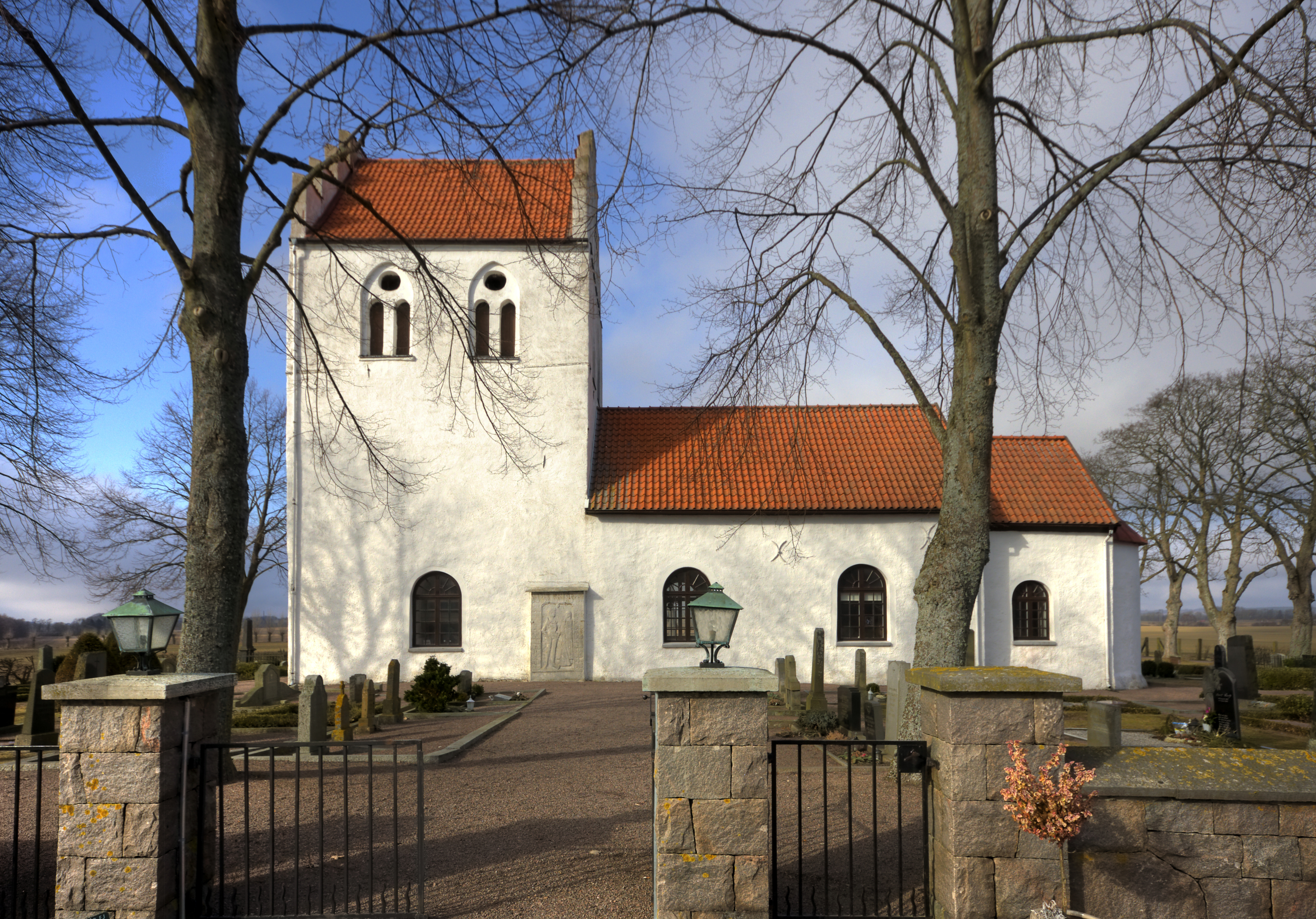
- Risekatslösa Church

- 56°03′06″N 12°56′47″E
- Country: Sweden
- Denomination: Church of Sweden

Risekatslösa Church (Swedish: Risekatslösa kyrka) is a medieval church in Bjuv Municipality in the province of Skåne, Sweden.

== History ==
The church was built c. 1200. During the 14th century, a church porch (demolished in the 19th century) was added and during the 15th century the church tower was built. During the same 15th century, decorated vaults were also constructed to support the ceiling. Traditionally, the church was closely connected with the owners of Boserup, a manor house nearby. The church was renovated in 1936, when the medieval vault decorations were uncovered. Further renovations have been carried out during the 20th century, the latest in 1998.

== Architecture and furnishings ==
The church consists of a nave, chancel and apse, as well as a tower. The altarpiece is from 1748 and the pulpit from 1752, both by local craftsman Johan Ullberg. The baptismal font is from the 12th century and the rood cross probably from the 15th century.
