= Johanneskyrkan =

Johanneskyrkan, Johannes kyrka, or variants thereof, may refer to:

== Finland ==
- St. John's Church, Helsinki

== Sweden ==
- Saint John's Church, Habo
- St. John's Church, Malmö
- St. John's Catholic Church, Stockholm

== See also ==
- St. John's Church (disambiguation)
