= Salem Church in Habo =

Coordinates: 57.9164°N 14.0769°E

- Salemkyrkan i Habo
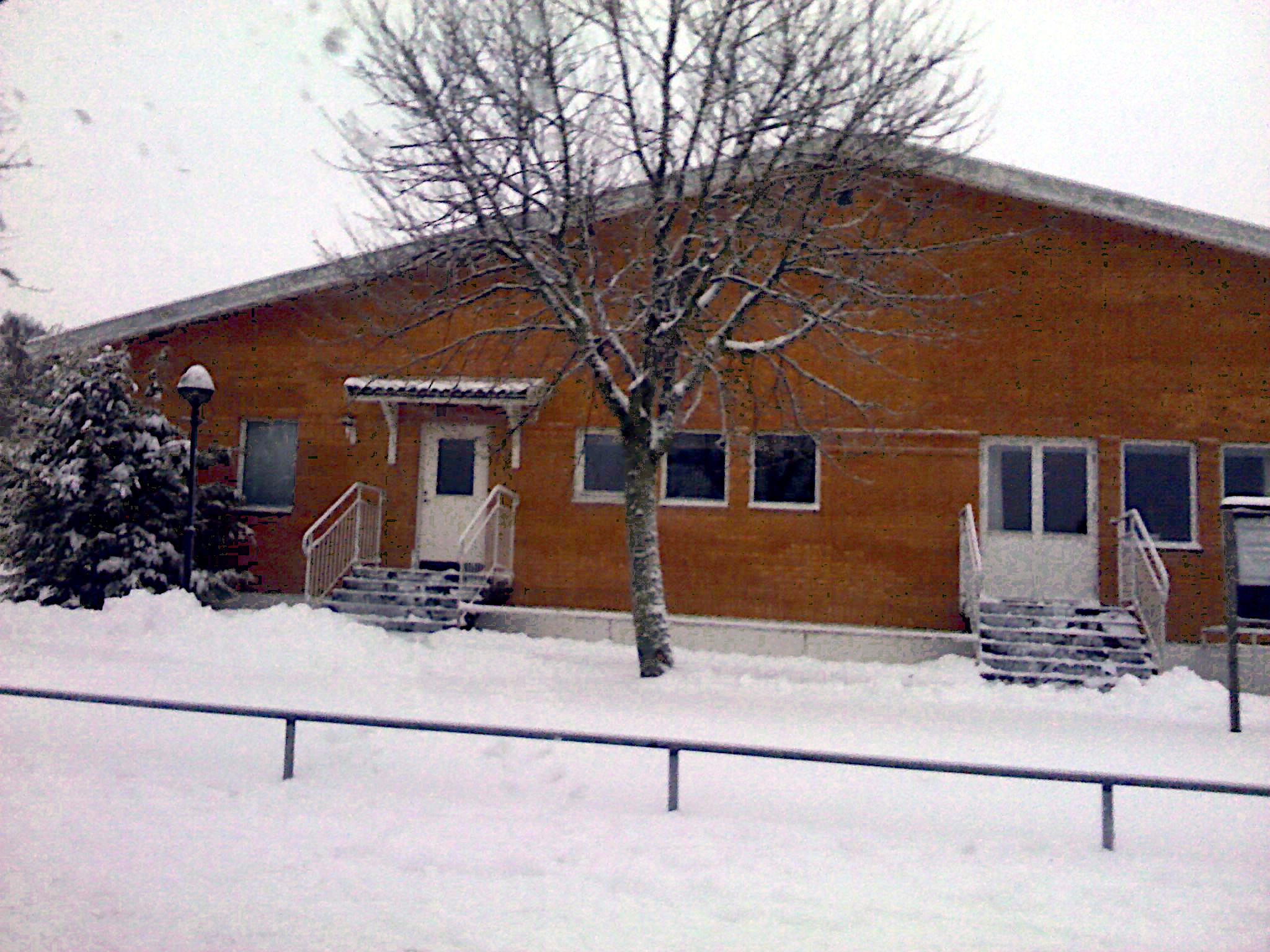
- Salem Church in Habo. December 2013
- Salem Church in Habo
- Location: Habo
- Country: Sweden
- Denomination: Evangelical Free Church in Sweden

History
- Consecrated: 31 May 1991

Administration
- Parish: Habo

The Salem Church in Habo (Swedish: Salemkyrkan i Habo) is a church building in Habo, Sweden belonging to the Evangelical Free Church in Sweden. The current church building was opened on 31 May 1991.
