= Hålanda Church =

Coordinates: 58°02′36″N 12°17′05″E

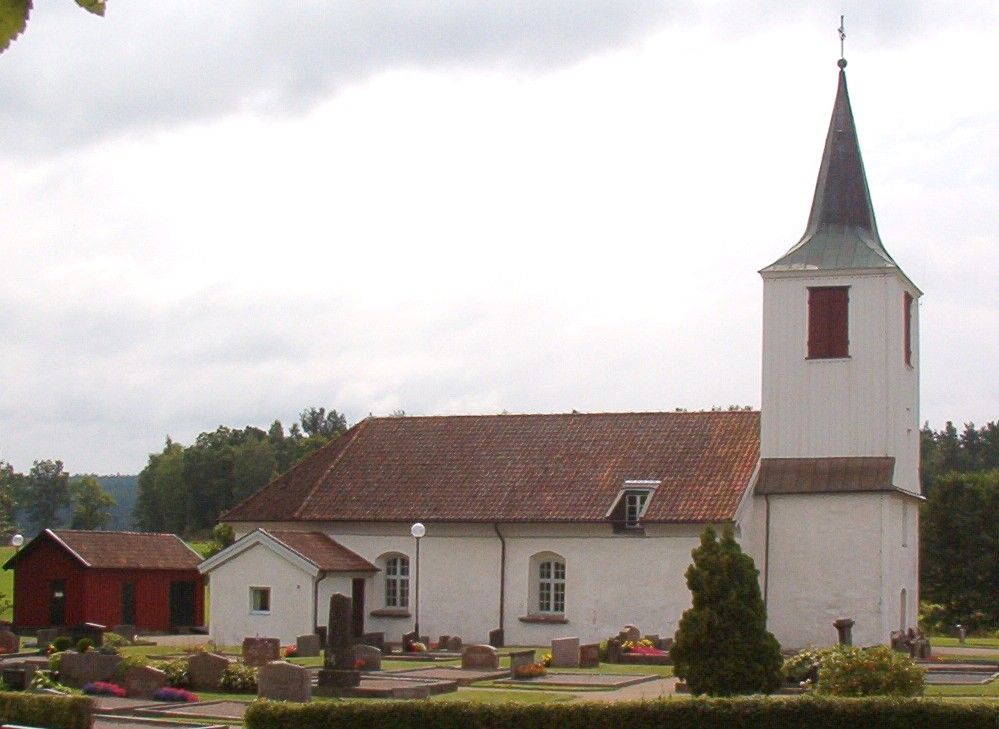
- Hålanda Church in Augusti 2005
- Location: Hålanda, Västra Götaland County
- Country: Sweden
- Denomination: Church of Sweden
- Website: Skepplanda-Hålanda parish

History
- Consecrated: 1756 (12th century)

Hålanda Church (Swedish: Hålanda kyrka) is a church in Hålanda, Skepplanda-Hålanda, in the diocese of Gothenburg, which lies in Västergötland, Sweden.

== History ==
The original church dates to the 12th or 13th century, and a significant part of the current nave remains. Here are found murals likely to have been added in medieval times. The baptismal font of soapstone is from the 1200s and consists of round cuppa with stem and foot. The altar is probably from the 1600s and consists of an altarpiece is an oil painting on canvas with motifs depicting the crucifixion. The painting is flanked by two painted angels. In its present form, the church was completed in 1756. Several of the paintings were added 20 years later by Jonas Dürcks. The organ was added in 1887 and was built by Molander & Eriksson of Gothenburg. In 1922 the organ was renovated, and it was rebuilt in 1954 by Grönvall. In 1957 the current sacristy in the north replaced an earlier sacristy from 1767.
