= Bjurbäck Church =

Coordinates: 57.8606°N 13.7941°E

- Bjurbäcks kyrka
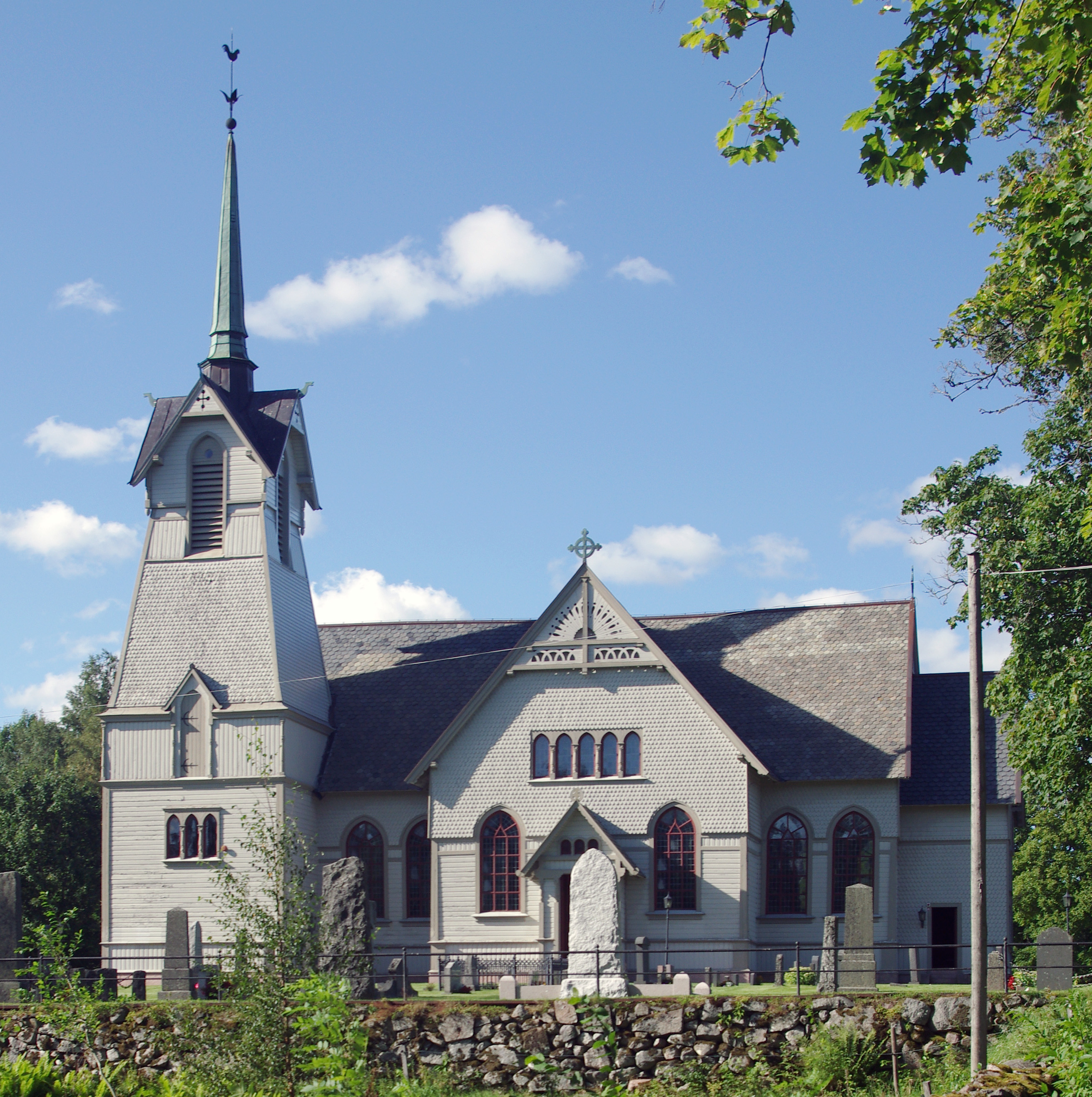
- Bjurbäck Church in August 2011
- Bjurbäck Church
- Location: Mullsjö Municipality
- Country: Sweden
- Denomination: Church of Sweden

History
- Consecrated: 23 July 1899

Administration
- Diocese: Skara
- Parish: Mullsjö-Sandhem

Bjurbäck Church (Swedish: Bjurbäcks kyrka) is a church building in Mullsjö Municipality in Sweden, located on the northeastern shorelines of the Lake Näs. Belonging to the Mullsjö-Sandhem Parish of the Church of Sweden, it was inaugurated on 23 July 1899, replacing a 1732 church.
