= Hemsjö Church =

Church in Hemsjö, Sweden

Coordinates: 57°50′51″N 12°28′43″E

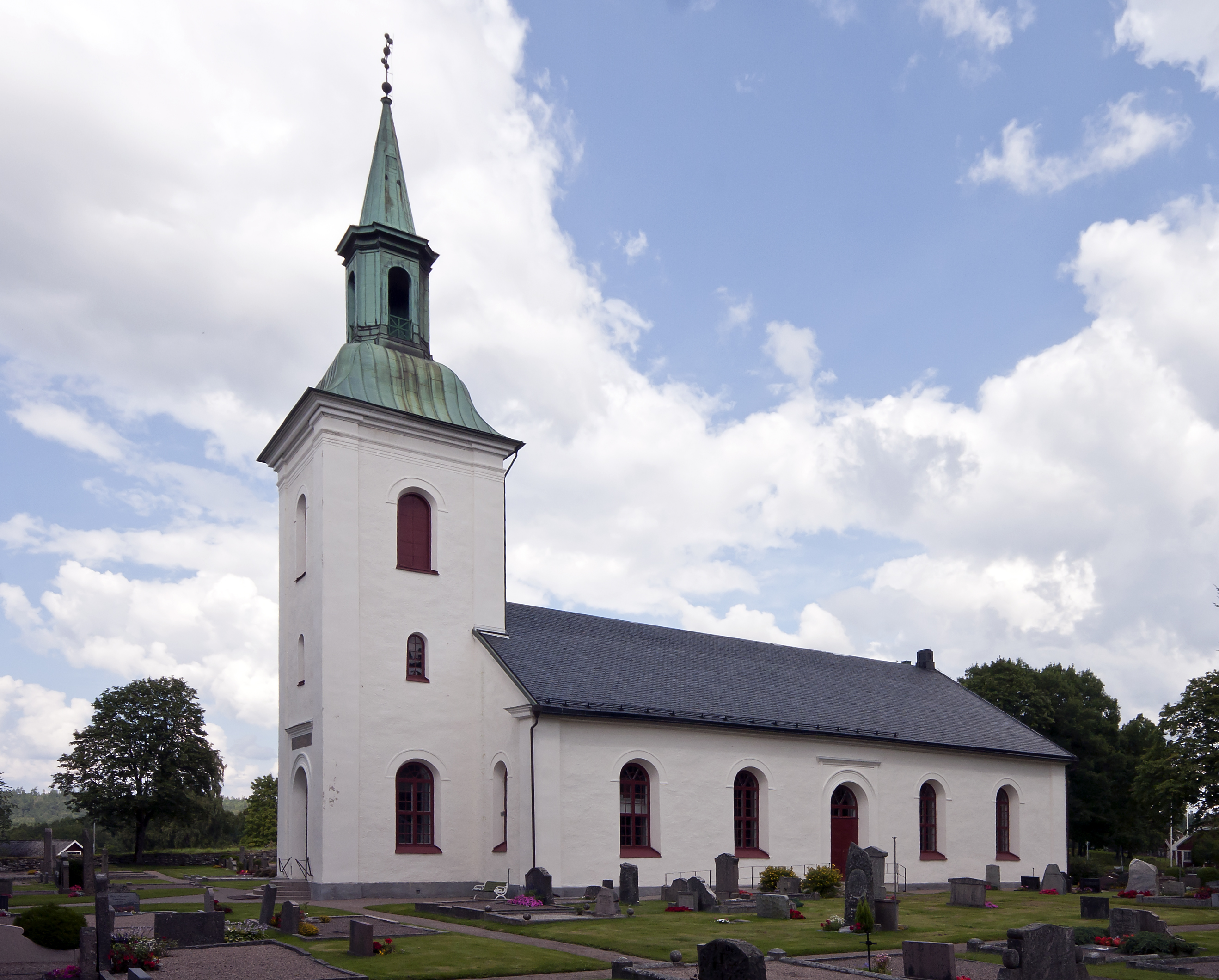
Hemsjö Church

Hemsjö Church (Swedish: Hemsjö kyrka) is a church in Hemsjö, Alingsås, Västergötland, Sweden. It belongs to the parish of Hemsjö parish in the Diocese of Skara. Hemsjö church is believed to be the fourth church in the village and was inaugurated on October 5, 1862, about 900 metres west of the site where the earlier churches stood. The medieval baptismal font belonged to State Historical Museum in Stockholm, but it was reinstated in Hemsjö church in 2005.
