= Gräshagen Church =

Coordinates: 57.7648°N 14.1363°E

- Gräshagskyrkan
- Gräshagen Church
- Location: Gräshagen
- Country: Sweden
- Denomination: Church of Sweden

History
- Consecrated: 1 December 1962

Administration
- Diocese: Växjö
- Parish: Jönköping Sofia-Järstorp

The Gräshagen Church (Swedish: Gräshagskyrkan) is a church building at Gräshagen in Jönköping, Sweden. Belonging to the Jönköping Sofia-Järstorp Parish of the Church of Sweden, it was opened on 1 December 1962.
