= Gränna Church =

Coordinates: 58.0203°N 14.4653°E

- Gränna kyrka
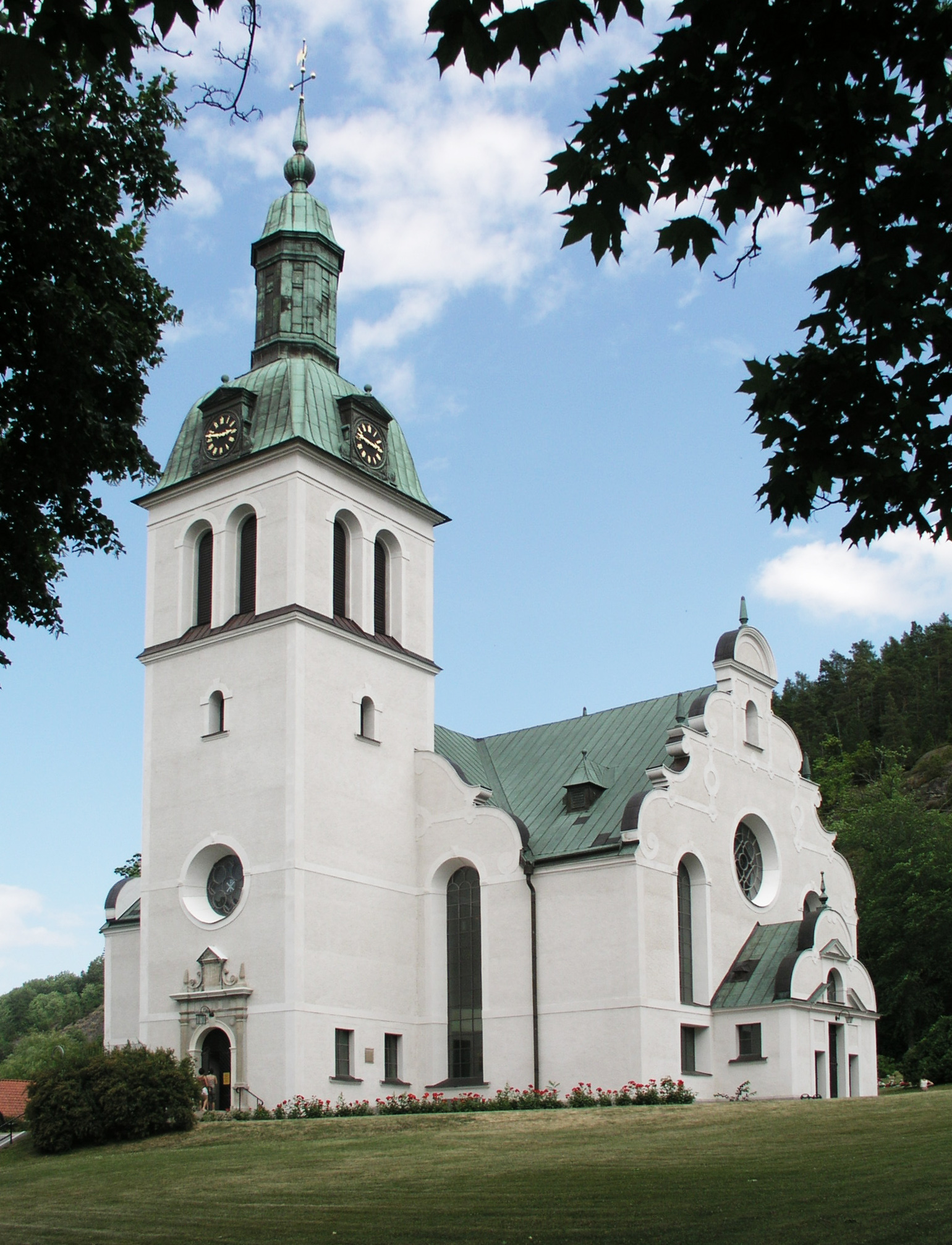
- Gränna Church in July 2006
- Gränna Church
- Location: Gränna
- Country: Sweden
- Denomination: Church of Sweden

History
- Consecrated: 15 September 1895

Administration
- Diocese: Växjö
- Parish: Gränna

Gränna Church (Swedish: Gränna kyrka) is a church building in Gränna in Sweden. Belonging to the Gränna Parish of the Church of Sweden, it was opened on September 15, 1895, replacing an older church destroyed by an 1889 fire.

The church stands in the heart of Gränna, dominating the town's skyline. It was built on the remnants of the original stone church dating back to the middle of the 12th century. The foundation of that church is still preserved under the floor of today's Gränna Church.

The original church was rebuilt and expanded in several stages over the centuries. For example, Count Per Brahe the Younger funded the cost of a new stone tower in 1673. Much of that church was destroyed in the 1889 fire. However, many furnishings were saved from the fire, including the altarpiece, a medieval communion cabinet and some light fixtures and artwork. Articles rescued from the fire are now on display inside Gränna Church.

The church has been designated a “vägkyrka,” a roadside church open to travelers. It generally is open from the end of June until the beginning of August, with a host or hostess, guided tours, music and coffee.

SVT's Luciamorgon in December 2019 was celebrated inside the church.
