= Capella Ecumenica =

Chapel in Östergötland, Sweden

Coordinates: 58.41545°N 16.71982°E

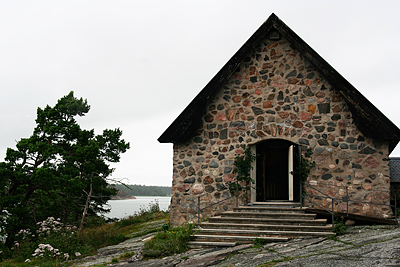
- Capella Ecumenica in July 2007
- Capella Ecumenica
- Country: Sweden

History
- Founded: 27 May 1965

Capella Ecumenica Sanctæ Annæ in scopulis is a chapel in the archipelago of Sankt Anna, in the province of Östergötland, Sweden. It was inaugurated and is run by the order of Capella Ecumenica Sanctae Annae in scopulis.
