= Damir Bjelopoljak =

Bosnian volleyball player

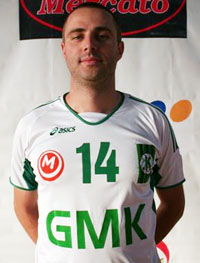

Personal information
- Full name: Damir Bjelopoljak
- Born: 15 May 1979 (age 47); Sarajevo, Bosnia and Herzegovina
- Height: 1.94 m (6 ft 4 1/2 in)

Volleyball information
- Position: setter
- Current club: OK Kakanj

Career
Years	Teams
1994-1999; 1999-2004; 2005-2010	OK Kakanj; OK SINPOS; OK Kakanj

National team
2000–2004	Bosnia and Herzegovina
Honours
Men's Premier League of Volleyball of Bosnia and Herzegovina
Gold medal – first place	2004	Team
Gold medal – first place	2005	Team
Gold medal – first place	2008	Team
National Cup of Bosnia and Herzegovina
Gold medal – first place	2004	Team
Gold medal – first place	2006	Team
Gold medal – first place	2008	Team
Gold medal – first place	2009	Team

Damir Bjelopoljak is a Bosnian volleyball player at the highest national level. He was born in Kakanj, Bosnia and Herzegovina. He plays for OK Kakanj in the Premier League of Volleyball of Bosnia and Herzegovina. He is 194 cm tall and plays as Setter.

Damir Bjelopoljak has spent most of his playing career at OK Kakanj, Bosnia's most successful volleyball club, 1994–1999, 2004–2006 and 2008-2010. He was a member of the Premier League of Volleyball of Bosnia and Herzegovina national championship winning team 4 times (2004, 2005, 2008 and 2010)) and the National Cup of Bosnia and Herzegovina 5 times (2004, 2006, 2008, 2009 and 2010).

He has been a member of OK Kakanj's national Cup and League double-winning team three times, including the third consecutive occasion in 2010. He has also competed for the club at European level in the CEV Challenge Cup in 2008 and 2010.

== Clubs ==
Club	Country	From	To
OK Kakanj	Bosnia and Herzegovina	1994	1999
OK SINPOS	Bosnia and Herzegovina	2000	2004
OK Kakanj	Bosnia and Herzegovina	2000	2009

== See also ==
Almir Aganović, Haris Zolota, Ermin Lepić
