= Gustav Adolf Church, Habo Municipality =

Coordinates: 57.9606°N 14.0585°E

Gustav Adolf Church
- Gustav Adolfs kyrka
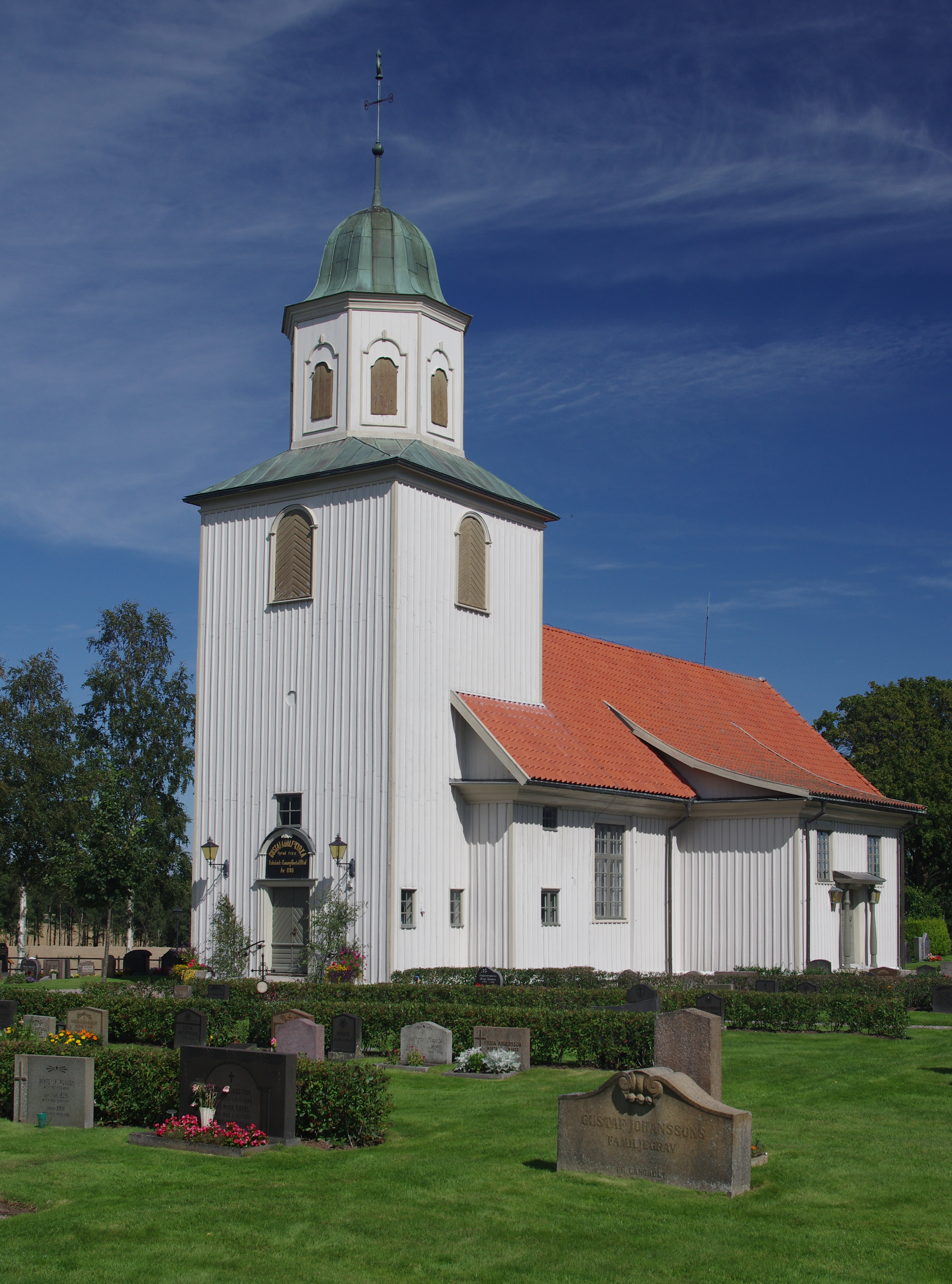
- Gustav Adolf Church in August 2011
- Gustav Adolf Church
- Location: Habo Municipality
- Country: Sweden
- Denomination: Church of Sweden

History
- Consecrated: 19 November 1780

Administration
- Diocese: Skara
- Parish: Gustav Adolf

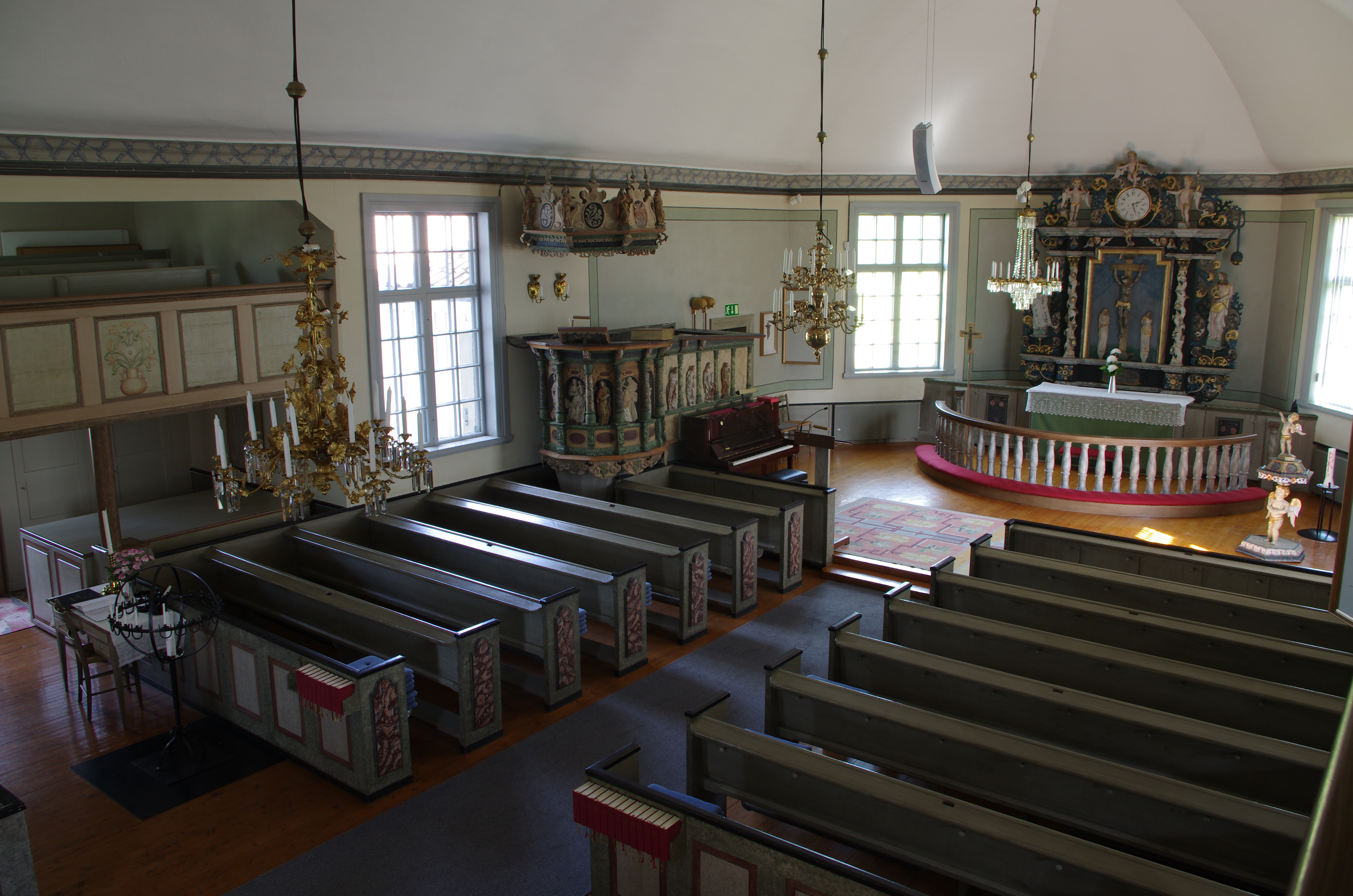
Inside Gustav Adolf Church

Gustav Adolf Church (Swedish: Gustav Adolfs kyrka) is a church in Habo Municipality in Sweden. Belonging to the Gustav Adolf Parish of the Church of Sweden, it was moved from Fiskebäck in 1780. On 19 November 1780, the church was inaugurated at its new location.
