= Adnan Herco =

Bosnian volleyball player

Personal information
- Full name: Adnan Herco
- Born: 16 March 1982 (age 44); Sarajevo, Yugoslavia (present-day Bosnia)
- Height: 1.95 m (6 ft 5 in)

Volleyball information
- Position: Spiker
- Current club: -

Career
Years	Teams
1994-1999; 1999-2006; 2006-2007; 2007-2018	OK Breza; OK Kakanj; Hestra Skid; Habo Wolley

National team
1999	Bosnia and Herzegovina, Sweden
Honours
Men's Premier League of Volleyball of Bosnia and Herzegovina
Gold medal – first place	2000	OK Kakanj
Gold medal – first place	2001	OK Kakanj
Gold medal – first place	2003	OK Kakanj
Gold medal – first place	2004	OK Kakanj
Gold medal – first place	2005	OK Kakanj
National Cup of Bosnia and Herzegovina
Gold medal – first place	2001	OK Kakanj
Gold medal – first place	2002	OK Kakanj
Gold medal – first place	2003	OK Kakanj
Gold medal – first place	2004	OK Kakanj
Gold medal – first place	2006	OK Kakanj

Adnan Herco is a Bosnian volleyball player. He was born in Sarajevo, in Bosnia and Herzegovina. He played for Habo Wolley in the Swedish volleyball championship and is one of the club's best-known players. He was the highest point scorer in the Swedish Volleyball League Svenska Volleybollförbundet in the 2010-2011 and 2011–2012 season. He is 195 cm and plays as a spiker.

Playing for OK Kakanj, Bosnia's most successful volleyball club, he was a member of the Premier League of Volleyball of Bosnia and Herzegovina national championship winning team 5 times (2000, 2001, 2003, 2004, 2005) and the National Cup of Bosnia and Herzegovina winning team on 4 occasions (2001, 2002, 2003, 2004, 2006). At OK Kakanj, he played as passer-side attacker.

He has made 3 international appearances for the Bosnia and Herzegovina national volleyball team.

== Clubs ==
Club	Country	From	To
OK Breza	Bosnia and Herzegovina	1994	1999
OK Kakanj	Bosnia and Herzegovina	1999	2006
Hestra Skid	Sweden	2006	2007
Habo Wolley	Sweden	2007	2018

https://www.jnytt.se/article/adnan-herco-nara-att-sluta-nu-laddar-han-om/
