= Zolota =

Zolota or Zolotas may refer to:

== Places ==
- Zolota Lypa, a river in Western Ukraine
- Zolota Balka, a village in Beryslav Raion in Kherson Oblast of southern Ukraine
- Zolota Sloboda, a village in Kozova

== People ==
- Kostas Zolotas (1934–2021), Greek mountain guide
- Haris Zolota (born 1970), Bosnian international volleyball player
- Xenophon Zolotas (1904–2004), Greek economist
