= Aldin Spahović =

Bosnian volleyball player (born 1979)

Personal information
- Full name: Aldin Spahović
- Born: March 2, 1979 (age 47); Goražde, Bosnia and Herzegovina
- Height: 2.02 m (6 ft 7 1/2 in)

Volleyball information
- Position: opposite
- Current club: -

Career
Years	Teams
1996–1999; 1999–2001; 2002–2004	OK Gorazde; OK Bihac; OK Kakanj

National team
1999-2004	Bosnia and Herzegovina
Honours
Men's Premier League of Volleyball of Bosnia and Herzegovina
Gold medal – first place	2003	Team
National Cup of Bosnia and Herzegovina
Gold medal – first place	2002	Team
Gold medal – first place	2003	Team

Aldin Spahović is a Bosnian volleyball player at national and international level. He is 202 cm (80 in) and played as Opposite. He was born in Goražde, Bosnia and Herzegovina.

He played as Spiker/Opposite for Bosnia's most successful volleyball club OK Kakanj, as a member of the Premier League of Volleyball of Bosnia and Herzegovina national championship winning team in 2003 and in the National Cup of Bosnia and Herzegovina winning team in 2002 and 2003.

== Clubs ==
Club	Country	From	To
OK Goražde	Bosnia and Herzegovina	1996	1999
OK Bihać	Bosnia and Herzegovina	1999	2001
OK Kakanj	Bosnia and Herzegovina	2002	2004
