= Sanjin Bezdrob =

Bosnian volleyball player

Personal information
- Full name: Sanjin Bezdrob
- Born: 22 November 1979 (age 46); Sarajevo, Bosnia and Herzegovina
- Height: 1.97 m (6 ft 5 1/2 in)

Volleyball information
- Position: Spiker
- Current club: OK Bosna

Career
Years	Teams
1995–2001; 2001–2004; 2004–2005; 2005–2006; 2006–2008; 2008–2009; 2009–2010; 2012–2017; 2017	OK Bosna; OK Kakanj; OK Calcit Kamnik; OK Bosna; OK Ljubinje; OK Bosna; OK Ljubinje; OK Ilijaš; OK Bosna

National team
2000–2021	Bosnia and Herzegovina
Honours
Men's Premier League of Volleyball of Bosnia and Herzegovina
Gold medal – first place	2001	Team
Gold medal – first place	2003	Team
Gold medal – first place	2013	Team
National CUP of Bosnia and Herzegovina
Gold medal – first place	2001	Team
Gold medal – first place	2002	Team
Gold medal – first place	2003	Team

Sanjin Bezdrob (born 22 November 1979) is a Bosnian volleyball player at national and international level and captain of the Bosnian national volleyball team.

Playing for Bosnia's most successful volleyball club OK Kakanj, he was a member of the Premier League of Volleyball of Bosnia and Herzegovina national championship winning team 2 times (2001, 2003) and the National Cup of Bosnia and Herzegovina winning team on 3 occasions (2001, 2002, 2003).

In the 2004–2005 season he played for OK Calcit Kamnik (Slovenia), including appearances in the CEV Cup.

In the 2009–2010 season he played for OK Ljubinje.

In the 2012–2017 season he played for OK Ilijaš

He is 1.97 m (6 ft 51/2 in.) tall.
