= Salih Fazlić =

Bosnian volleyball player

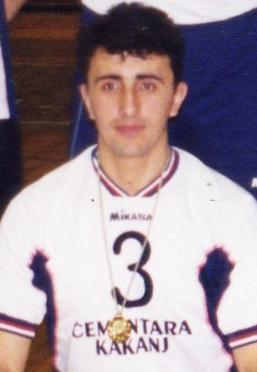

Personal information
- Full name: Salih Fazlić
- Born: August 25, 1975 (age 51); Kakanj, Bosnia and Herzegovina
- Height: 1.92 m (6 ft 4 in)

Volleyball information
- Position: Middle-blocker
- Current club: OK Kakanj
- Number: 3

Career
Years	Teams
1993-2008	OK Kakanj
Honours
Men's Premier League of Volleyball of Bosnia and Herzegovina
Gold medal – first place	2000	Team
Gold medal – first place	2001	Team
Gold medal – first place	2003	Team
Gold medal – first place	2004	Team
Gold medal – first place	2005	Team
National CUP of Bosnia and Herzegovina
Gold medal – first place	1994	Team
Gold medal – first place	1995	Team
Gold medal – first place	1996	Team
Gold medal – first place	1997	Team
Gold medal – first place	2001	Team
Gold medal – first place	2002	Team
Gold medal – first place	2003	Team
Gold medal – first place	2004	Team
Gold medal – first place	2006	Team

Salih Fazlić (born 25 August 1975) is a Bosnian volleyball player at the highest national level.

He played for Bosnia's most successful volleyball club OK Kakanj in the teams that won the Premier League of Volleyball of Bosnia and Herzegovina national championship six times (2000, 2001, 2003, 2004, 2005, 2008) and the National Cup of Bosnia and Herzegovina 9 times (1994, 1995, 1996, 1997, 2001, 2002, 2003, 2004, 2006), achieving the national league and cup-winning double three times.

Salih spent his entire professional career at OK Kakanj(1994–2008)and was a team captain in 2000.

He played mainly as middle-blocker/hitter, but also played as libero and spiker.

He is coach of the OK Kakanj women's team.
