= Aganović =

Aganović is a surname derived from the Ottoman honorific title aga. Notable people with the surname include:

- Admir Aganović (born 1986), Bosnia and Herzegovina footballer
- Adnan Aganović (born 1987), footballer
- Ali Aganović (born 1902, died 1961), Bosnian imam
- Almir Aganović (born 1973), Bosnia and Herzegovina volleyball player
- Eldijana Aganović (born 1971), Croatian table tennis player
