= HOK Domaljevac =

- Founded: 1980; 45 years ago
- Manager: Zlatko Ivić
- League: Premier League
- 2020-21: 2nd

Uniforms
| Home | Away |

Hrvatski Odbojkaški Klub Domaljevac is a volleyball club from Domaljevac, Bosnia and Herzegovina. It currently competes in the Premier League, the top tier volleyball league of Bosnia and Herzegovina.

== History ==
The club was founded 1980 as OK Mladost. In 2020 they won the Cup of Federation of Bosnia and Herzegovina, the second tier volleyball cup of Bosnia and Herzegovina.

They play their matches in the sports hall of the high school in Orašje, due to the lack of an arena in Domaljevac.

== Honours ==
- Bosnia and Herzegovina Championship:
  - Runner-up (2): 2021, 2022
- Volleyball Cup of Bosnia and Herzegovina:
  - Runner-up (3): 2017, 2021, 2022
- Volleyball Cup of Federation of Bosnia and Herzegovina:
  - Winners (1): 2020

== Recent seasons ==
The recent season-by-season performance of the club:

| Season | Division | Tier | Position |
|---|---|---|---|
| 2014-15 | Premier League | I | 8th |
| 2015-16 | Premier League | I | 7th |
| 2016-17 | Premier League | I | 4th |
| 2017-18 | Premier League | I | 4th |
| 2018-19 | Premier League | I | 3rd |
| 2019-20 | Premier League | I | 3rd |
| 2020–21 | Premier League | I | 2nd |
| 2021–22 | Premier League | I | 4th |

== Notable players ==
- (Turkey) Tomislav Čošković
- (Turkey) Marko Matić
- (Croatia) Pero Stanić

== Coaching history ==
- Đuro Kesić
- Mijo Leovac
- Anto Tepeluk
- Anto Kobaš
- Leo Barić
- Pero Stanić
- Ivan Mijić
- Zlatko Ivić
