= Emir Bajramović =

Bosnian volleyball player

Personal information
- Born: 25 August 1980 (age 46); Zenica, Bosnia
- Height: 1.94 m (6 ft 4 in)

Volleyball information
- Position: Middle-blocker
- Current club: OK Zenica
- Number: 6

Career
Years	Teams
1998-2008	OK Zenica / OK Kakanj
Honours
Men's Premier League of Volleyball of Bosnia and Herzegovina
Gold medal – first place	2000	Team
Gold medal – first place	2001	Team
Gold medal – first place	2003	Team
Gold medal – first place	2004	Team
Gold medal – first place	2005	Team
Gold medal – first place	2008	Team
National Cup of Bosnia and Herzegovina
Gold medal – first place	2001	Team
Gold medal – first place	2002	Team
Gold medal – first place	2003	Team
Gold medal – first place	2004	Team
Gold medal – first place	2006	Team

Emir Bajramović (known simply as Bajro; born 1980) is a Bosnian volleyball player.

He played for Bosnia's volleyball club OK Kakanj in the teams that won the Premier League of Volleyball of Bosnia and Herzegovina national championship six times (2000, 2001, 2003, 2004, 2005, 2008) and the National Cup of Bosnia and Herzegovina 5 times (2001, 2002, 2003, 2004, 2006), achieving the national league and cup-winning double three times.
