= Smyrna Church Habo =

Coordinates: 57.9066°N 14.0726°E

- Smyrnakyrkan Habo
- Smyrna Church Habo
- Location: Habo
- Country: Sweden
- Denomination: Evangelical Free Church in Sweden

History
- Consecrated: 30 November 1975

Administration
- Parish: Habo

The Smyrna Church Habo (Swedish: Smyrnakyrkan Habo) is a church building in Habo, Sweden. It belongs the Evangelical Free Church in Sweden and was inaugurated on First Advent Sunday 1975.
