= Fagerhult =

Fagerhult may refer to many places in Sweden, including:

- Fagerhult, Habo Municipality, an urban area in Habo Municipality
- Fagerhult, Högsby Municipality, an urban area in Högsby Municipality
- Fagerhult, Uddevalla Municipality, an urban area in Uddevalla Municipality
