= Furusjö =

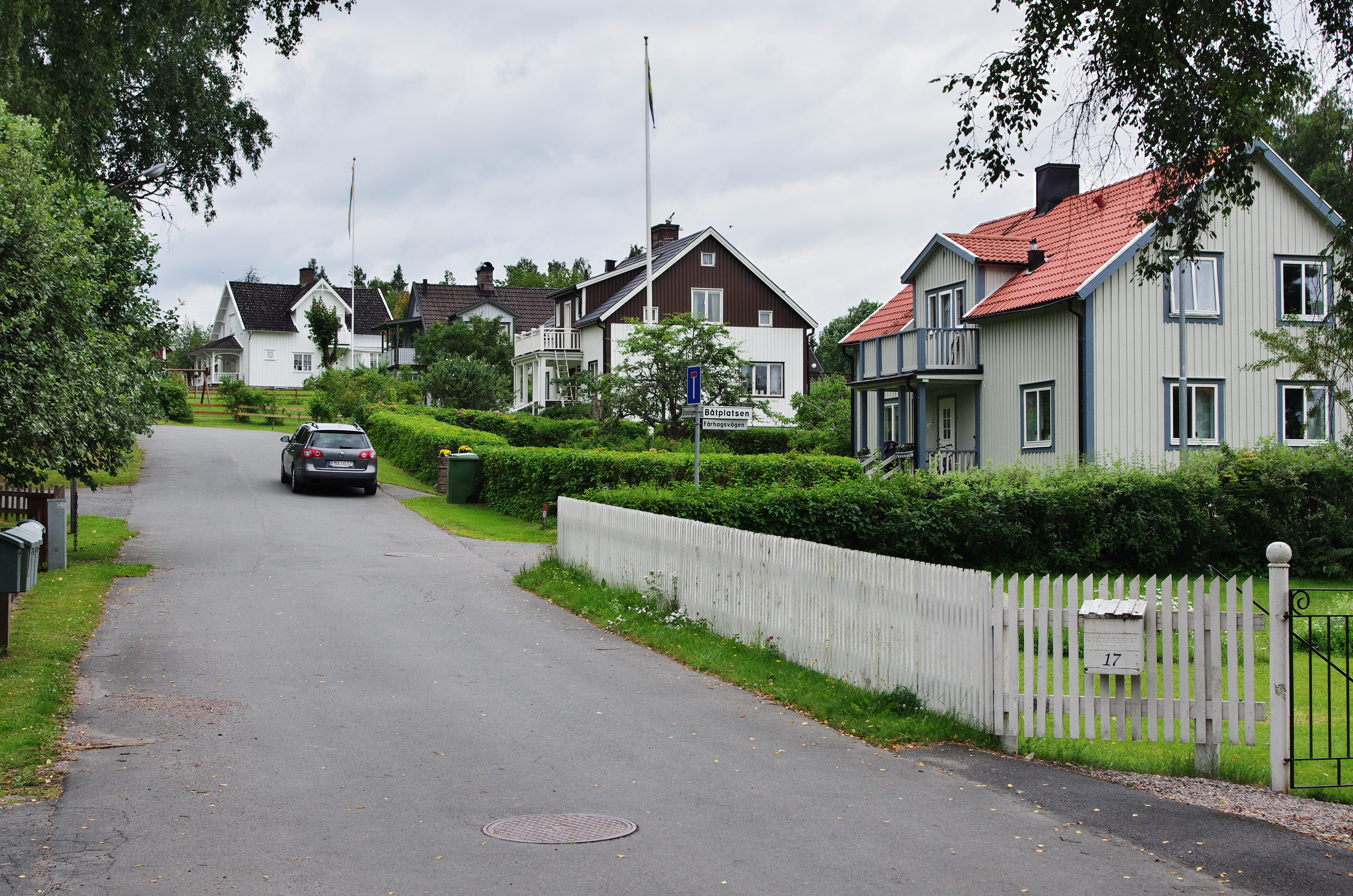
- Furusjö in July 2011

- Location within Jönköping Location within Sweden
- Coordinates: 57°56′N 13°57′E
- Country: Sweden
- Province: Västergötland
- County: Jönköping County
- Municipality: Habo Municipality

Area
  - Total: 0.49 km^{2} (0.19 sq mi)

Population (31 December 2010)
  - Total: 325
  - Density: 664/km^{2} (1,720/sq mi)
- Time zone: UTC+1 (CET)
  - Summer (DST): UTC+2 (CEST)

Furusjö is a locality situated in Habo Municipality, Jönköping County, Sweden with 325 inhabitants in 2010.

== See also ==
- Furusjö Alliance Church
