= Fiskebäck Chapel =

Coordinates: 57.8796°N 14.1066°E

- Fiskebäcks kapell
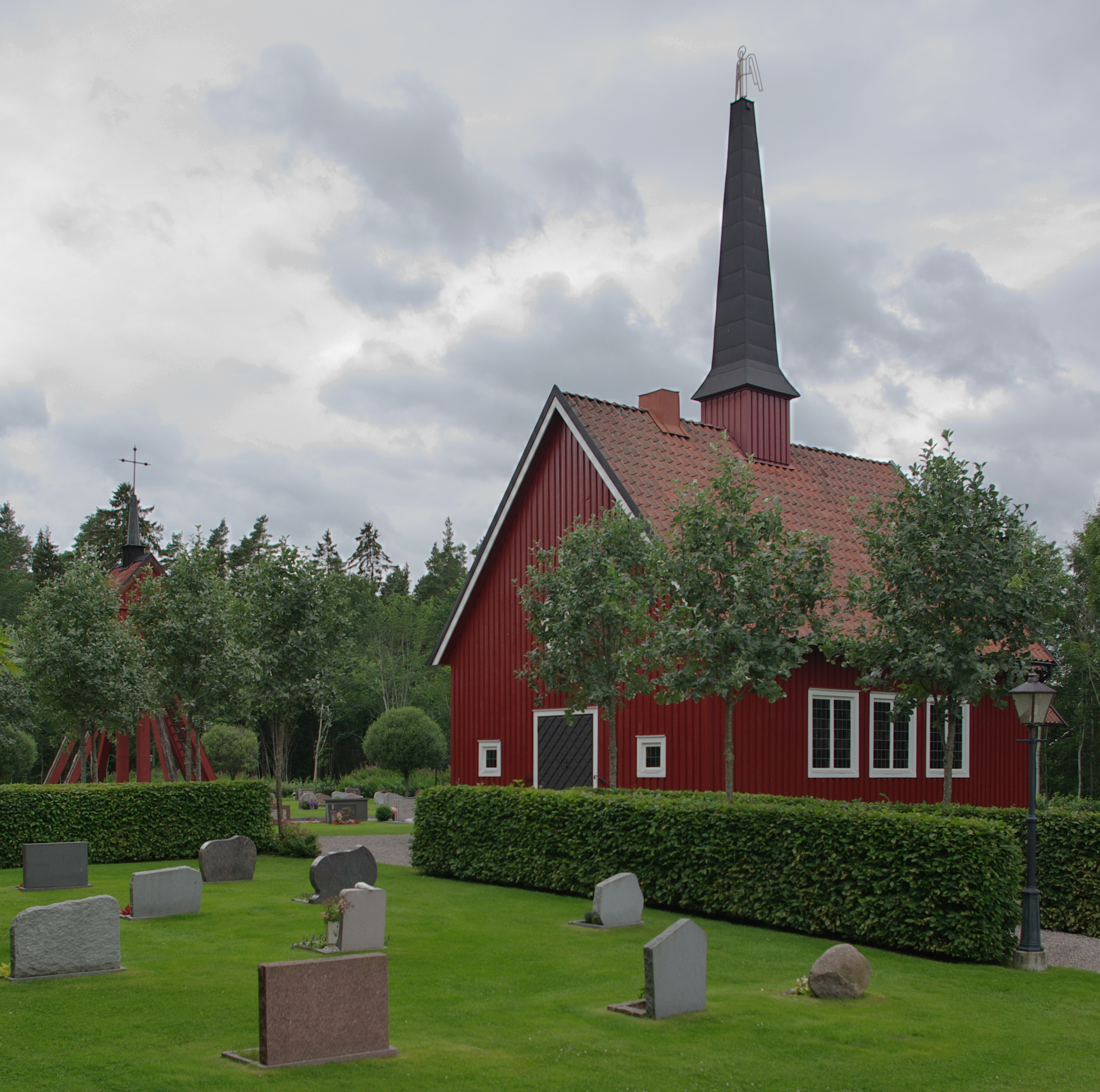
- Fiskebäck Chapel in July 2011
- Fiskebäck Chapel
- Location: Fiskebäck
- Country: Sweden
- Denomination: Church of Sweden

History
- Consecrated: 2 December 1939

Administration
- Diocese: Skara
- Parish: Habo

Fiskebäck Chapel (Swedish: Fiskebäcks kapell) is a chapel in Fiskebäck in Sweden. Belonging to the Habo Parish of the Church of Sweden, it was inaugurated on 2 December 1939.
