= Domaljevac-Šamac =

Coordinates: 45°03′46″N 18°34′51″E

Domaljevac-Šamac Домаљевац-Шамац
- Municipality
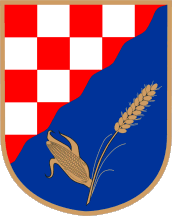
- Coat of arms

- Location of Domaljevac-Šamac within Bosnia and Herzegovina
- Country: Bosnia and Herzegovina
- Entity: Federation of Bosnia and Herzegovina
- Canton: Posavina
- Geographical region: Posavina

Government
  - Municipal mayor: Stjepan Piljić (HDZ BiH)

Area
  - Total: 444 km^{2} (171 sq mi)

Population (2013 census)
  - Total: 4,771
  - Density: 1,175/km^{2} (3,040/sq mi)
- Time zone: UTC+1 (CET)
  - Summer (DST): UTC+2 (CEST)
- Area code: +387 31
- Website: http://www.domaljevac.ba

Domaljevac-Šamac (Serbian Cyrillic: Домаљевац-Шамац) is a municipality located in Posavina Canton of the Federation of Bosnia and Herzegovina, an entity of Bosnia and Herzegovina. As of 2013, the municipality has a population of 4,771 inhabitants, while the village of Domaljevac has a population of 3,295 inhabitants.

== Demographics ==
=== Population ===
Population of settlements – Domaljevac-Šamac Municipality
Settlement	1971.	1981.	1991.	2013.
Total			4,771	5,216
Bazik			539	493
Bosanski Šamac				0
Domaljevac	3,699	4,009	4,152	3,295
Grebnice				903

=== Ethnic composition ===
Ethnic composition – Domaljevac (settlement)
	2013.	1991.	1981.	1971.
Total	3,295 (100,0%)	4,152 (100,0%)	4,009 (100,0%)	3,699 (100,0%)
Croats	3.248 (98,60%)	4.072 (98,07%)	3.836 (95,68%)	3.675 (99,35%)
Serbs	16 (0,50%)	20 (0,48%)	17 (0,42%)	12 (0,32%)
Bosniaks	14 (0,40%)	7 (0,16%)		
Yugoslavs		31 (0,74%)	98 (2,44%)	2 (0,05%)
Others	17 (0,50%)	22 (0,52%)	58 (1,44%)	10 (0,27%)

Ethnic composition – Domaljevac-Šamac Municipality
	2013.	1991.
Total	5,216 (100,0%)	4,691 (100,0%)
Croats	4,634 (97,13%)	4,598 (98,02%)
Serbs	92 (1,928%)	26 (0,554%)
Bosniaks	17 (0,356%)	7 (0,149%)
Unaffiliated	12 (0,252%)	
Roma	5 (0,105%)	
Yugoslavs	3 (0,063%)	35 (0,746%)
Unknown	3 (0,063%)	
Others	3 (0,063%)	25 (0,533%)
Ukrainians	2 (0,042%)	

== Sports ==
The municipality is home to HOK Domaljevac volleyball club.
