= Habo Municipality =

Habo Municipality Habo kommun
- Municipality
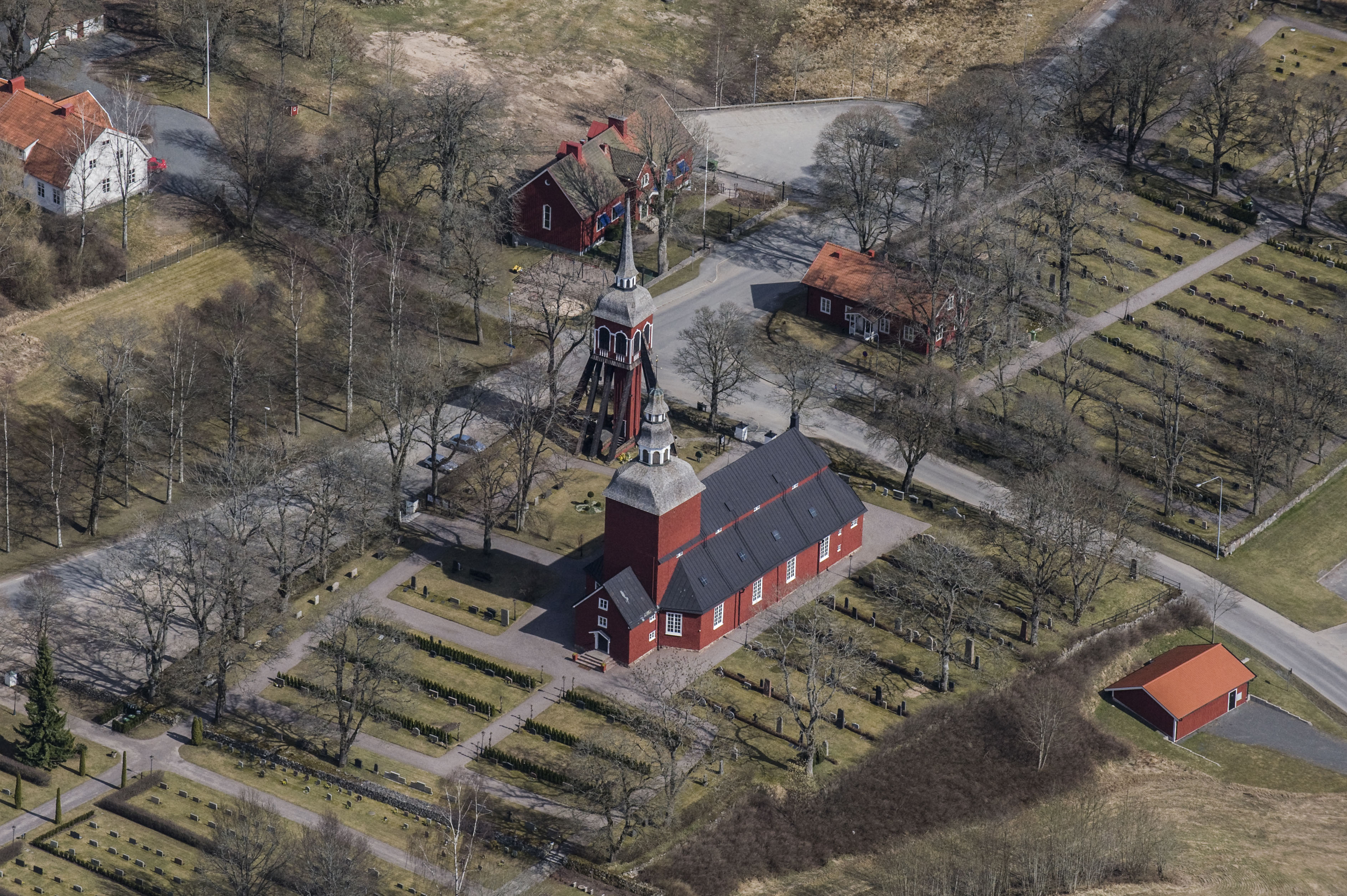

- Coat of arms

- Coordinates: 57°55′N 14°04′E
- Country: Sweden
- County: Jönköping County
- Seat: Habo

Area
  - Total: 462.24 km^{2} (178.47 sq mi)
  - Land: 328.52 km^{2} (126.84 sq mi)
  - Water: 133.72 km^{2} (51.63 sq mi)
- Area as of 1 January 2014.

Population (30 June 2025)
  - Total: 13,488
  - Density: 41.057/km^{2} (106.34/sq mi)
- Time zone: UTC+1 (CET)
  - Summer (DST): UTC+2 (CEST)
- ISO 3166 code: SE
- Province: Västergötland
- Municipal code: 0643
- Website: www.habokommun.se

Habo Municipality (Swedish: Habo kommun) is a municipality in Jönköping County, southern Sweden, where the locality of Habo is seat.

The present municipality was formed in 1974 when a part of the dissolved rural municipality of Fågelsås was amalgamated with "old" Habo. It was transferred from the dissolved Skaraborg County to Jönköping County in 1998.

== Geography ==
Bordering on the east is the lake Vättern, the second largest lake in Sweden. Just outside the seat is a forest of beech woods planted by count Per Brahe the younger in the 17th century. Within the municipality are two nature reserves: Fiskebäck has a moist ground where hazel and oak have claimed most of the space in competition with aspen, bird cherry, birch, sallow, hawthorn, beech and ash; while Hökensås is distinguished by a varied terrain of valleys and slopes with some 50 tarns and small lakes and a fauna of great variety.

=== Localities ===
There are 3 urban areas (also called a Tätort or locality) in Habo Municipality.

In the table the localities are listed according to the size of the population as of December 31, 2005. The municipal seat is in bold characters.

#	Locality	Population
1	**Habo**	6,244
2	Furusjö	344
3	Fagerhult	317

Nätebäcken, Västerkärr, Baskarp, Björnhult, Grönestad and Hästebäcken are minor localities in Habo.

== Demographics ==
This is a demographic table based on Habo Municipality's electoral districts in the 2022 Swedish general election sourced from SVT's election platform, in turn taken from SCB official statistics.

In total there were 12,805 residents, including 9,141 Swedish citizens of voting age. 39.4% voted for the left coalition and 59.2% for the right coalition. Indicators are in percentage points except population totals and income.

Location	Residents	Citizen adults	Left vote	Right vote	Employed	Swedish parents	Foreign heritage	Income SEK	Degree
Location			%	%					
Bränninge	2,487	1,563	42.1	56.3	89	87	13	29,611	55
Centrum-Gunnarsbo	1,895	1,374	44.7	53.9	81	81	19	22,979	34
Gustav Adolf-Brandstorp	1,827	1,344	32.2	66.3	87	92	8	26,778	30
Kråkeryd-Mölekullen	1,837	1,292	42.5	56.4	89	90	10	29,910	47
Kyrkbyn-Furusjö	1,496	1,107	33.6	64.8	90	93	7	27,526	31
Kärnekulla-Sjogarp	1,551	1,242	32.9	65.7	91	93	7	33,040	50
Kärr	1,712	1,219	45.6	54.0	91	92	8	28,380	49
Source: SVT

== Schools ==
- Bränningeskolan 1975-
- Fagerhults skola 1910-
- Gröne Vägens Skola 1931-
- Habo Centralskola 1953-1998 (Divided in 1998. Grades F-5 became Hagenskolan, grades 6-9 became Hagabodaskolan)
- Hagenskolan 1998-
- Hagabodaskolan 1998-
- Kråkerydsskolan 1976-
- Malmgårdsskolan 1996-

== Sports ==
- BIF Fagerhult, formed 1949. floorball late 1980s-
- Habo Handboll, formed 1990. team handball 1990-
- Habo IF, formed April 26, 1926. association football 1926- earlier even other sports, for example bandy (1926-1998)
- Habo Wolley, formed 1987. volleyball
- Hagaboda SK, formed 1989. floorball
- Yellow Obah, formed 1995. volleyball (Farm team to Habo Wolley)

== Sights ==
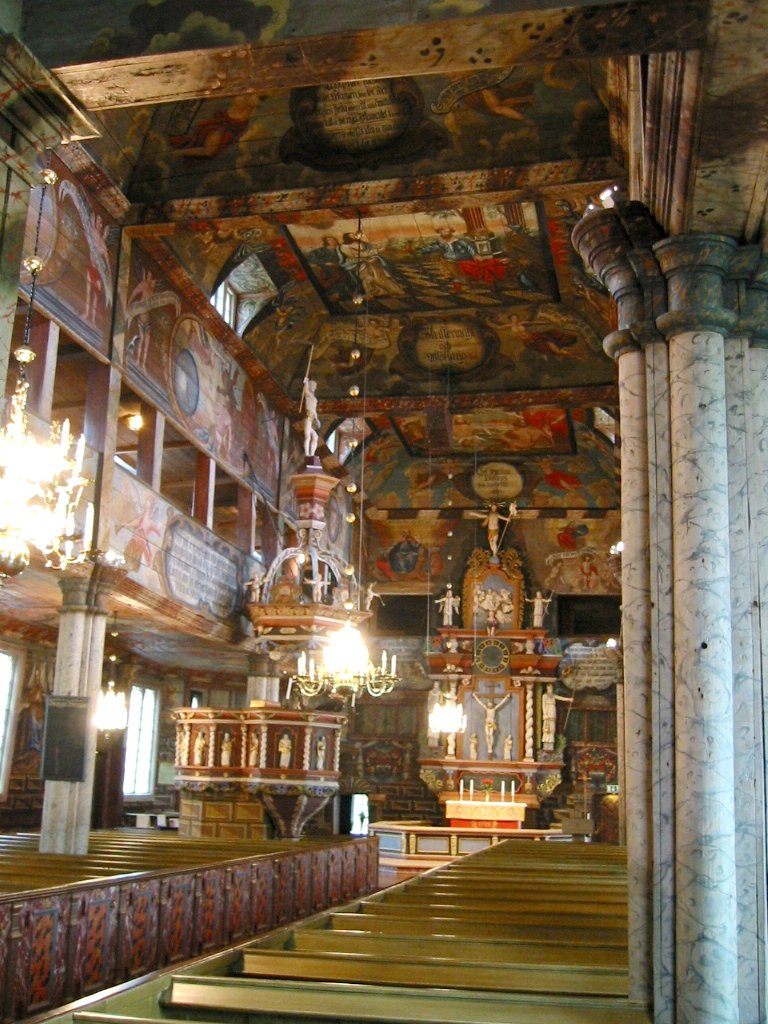
Habo church interior
