= OK Bosna =

Sarajevo volleyball club

- Founded: 1947; 78 years ago
- Ground: Skenderija D1 (Capacity: 700)
- Manager: Denis Dautović
- League: Premier League
- 2022-23: 4th

Uniforms
Home	Away

Odbojkaški Klub Bosna (English: Volleyball club Bosnia) is a volleyball club from Sarajevo, Bosnia and Herzegovina. The club was founded in 1947 and is part of the University Sport Society USD Bosna (Bosnian: Univerzitetsko Sportsko Društvo Bosna). The club plays its games in a hall in the skenderija part of town.

The Club used to play in the Yugoslav Volleyball League and today plays in the Premier League of Volleyball of Bosnia and Herzegovina.

== Honors ==
- Yugoslav Volleyball Championship:
  - Winners (1): 1986–87
- Volleyball Cup of Bosnia and Herzegovina:
  - Winners (1): 2005

== Recent seasons ==
The recent season-by-season performance of the club:

Season	Division	Tier	Position
2016-17	Premier League	I	9th↓
2017-18	Super League - South	II	1st
2018-19	Super League - South	II	1st↑
2019-20	Premier League	I	4th
2020-21	Premier League	I	3rd
2021-22	Premier League	I	7th

Key

↑ Promoted	↓ Relegated

== Notable players ==
- (Socialist Federal Republic of Yugoslavia) Miodrag Gvozdenović
- (Socialist Federal Republic of Yugoslavia) Radovan Malević
- (Bosnia and Herzegovina) Sanjin Bezdrob
- (Bosnia and Herzegovina) Haris Zolota
- (Socialist Federal Republic of Yugoslavia) Mirsad Imširović
- (Socialist Federal Republic of Yugoslavia) Milan Đurić
- (Socialist Federal Republic of Yugoslavia) Mirko Čulić
- (Socialist Federal Republic of Yugoslavia) Orhan Arslanagić
- (Socialist Federal Republic of Yugoslavia) Draško Stanišić
- (Socialist Federal Republic of Yugoslavia) Laslo Lukač

== Coaching history ==
- (Socialist Federal Republic of Yugoslavia) Neven Kurešević
- (Socialist Federal Republic of Yugoslavia) Laslo Lukač
- (Socialist Federal Republic of Yugoslavia) Draško Stanišić
- (Bulgaria) Todor Piperkov
- Sun Szida (China)
- (Socialist Federal Republic of Yugoslavia) Petar Popović
- (Socialist Federal Republic of Yugoslavia) Senad Begić
- (Socialist Federal Republic of Yugoslavia) Jovan Vukalović
- (Socialist Federal Republic of Yugoslavia) Mirsad Imširović
- (Socialist Federal Republic of Yugoslavia) Miralem Turčalo
- (Socialist Federal Republic of Yugoslavia) Sabahudin Peljto
