= OK Kakanj =

- Full name: Odbojkaški klub Kakanj
- Founded: October 21, 1979
- Ground: SC KAKANJ, Kakanj, Bosnia and Herzegovina
- Chairman: Bosnian
- Manager: Bosnian
- League: Premier League of Volleyball of Bosnia and Herzegovina

OK KAKANJ (Odbojkaški Klub Kakanj), is a professional volleyball club based in Kakanj, Bosnia and Herzegovina. The club was founded in 1979. The team plays in the Premier League of Volleyball of Bosnia and Herzegovina and has represented Bosnia and Herzegovina at European level in the Volleyball Men's CEV Cup where they are generally eliminated at 1/16 Finals stage. The team's home venue is the KSC "Kakanj" arena in Kakanj.

== Honours ==
Bosnia & Herzegovina League Champions (12): 1999/2000, 2000/01, 2002/03, 2003/4, 2004/5, 2007/08, 2008/09, 2009/10, 2011, 2012, 2013, 2022.

Bosnian & Herzegovina Cup Winners (15): 1993/94, 1994/95, 1995/96, 1996/97, 2000/01, 2001/02, 2002/03, 2003/04, 2005/06, 2007/08, 2008/09, 2009/10, 2010/2011, 2011/12, 2012/13.

League and Cup Double Crown (9): 2001, 2003, 2004, 2008, 2009, 2010, 2011, 2012,2013,.

=== Season 2005-2006 ===
No.	Name	Country	Position
3	Salih Fazlic	Bosnian	Middleplayer
5	Haris Zolota	Bosnian	Spiker
6	Emir Bajramovic	Bosnian	Middleplayer
7	Nedzmin Kozlo	Bosnian	Middleplayer
8	Amir Curan	Bosnian	Libero
9	Rijad Delic	Bosnian	Opposite
10	Almir Aganovic	Bosnian	Spiker
11	Ermin Lepic	Bosnian	Setter
12	Amir Brakmic	Bosnian	Middleplayer
13	Adnan Herco	Bosnian	Spiker
14	Damir Bjelopoljak	Bosnian	Setter
2	Emir Zecevic	Bosnian	Middleplayer

PREMIER LEAGUE OF VOLLEYBALL OF BOSNIA AND HERZEGOVINA 2005/2006 - OK Kakanj finished in 4th place

DATE	VENUE	TEAM	R	TEAM
02.10.2005	SARAJEVO	OK KAKANJ	3:2	Bosna SARAJEVO
08.10.2005	LUKAVICA	OK KAKANJ	3:0	Student PALE
15.10.2005	KAKANJ	OK KAKANJ	3:0	OK LJUBINJE
22.10.2005	MODRICA	OK KAKANJ	3:0	OK Napredak ODZAK
29.10.2005	KAKANJ	OK KAKANJ	3:1	OK 7 LUKAVAC
05.11.2005	BRCKO	OK KAKANJ	2:3	OK Brcko-Jedinstvo BRCKO
12.11.2005	KAKANJ	OK KAKANJ	3:1	Radnik-Elvaco BIJELJINA
26.11.2005	MODRICA	OK KAKANJ	1:3	Modrica-Optima MODRICA
02.12.2005	KAKANJ	OK KAKANJ	3:2	Gradina Ingram SREBRENIK
10.12.2005	KAKANJ	OK KAKANJ	3:0	Bosna SARAJEVO
21.01.2006	KAKANJ	OK KAKANJ	3:0	OK Student PALE
28.01.2006	LJUBINJE	OK KAKANJ	1:3	OK LJUBINJE
04.02.2006	KAKANJ	OK KAKANJ	2:3	OK Napredak ODZAK
11.02.2006	LUKAVAC	OK KAKANJ	3:2	OK 7 LUKAVAC
18.02.2006	KAKANJ	OK KAKANJ	2:3	OK Brcko-Jedinstvo BRCKO
25.02.2006	BIJELJINA	OK KAKANJ	1:3	OK Radnik-Elvaco BIJELJINA
04.03.2006	KAKANJ	OK KAKANJ	3:2	OK Modrica-Optima MODRICA
11.03.2006	SREBRENIK	OK KAKANJ	3:0	OK Gradina Ingram SREBRENIK

Final rankings 2005/2006

PLACE	TEAM
1.	Modrica-Optima MODRICA
2.	Radnik-Elvaco BIJELJINA
3.	OK Napredak ODZAK
4.	OK KAKANJ
5.	OK Brcko-Jedinstvo BRCKO
6.	OK 7 LUKAVAC
7.	OK Bosna SARAJEVO
8.	OK Gradina Ingram SREBRENIK
9.	OK LJUBINJE
10.	Student PALE

Championship Play-off 2005/06

MATCH	VENUE	TEAM	RESULT	TEAM
1st 4-final	BRCKO	Brcko-Jedinstvo BRCKO	2:3	OK KAKANJ
2nd 4-final	KAKANJ	OK KAKANJ	3:2	Brcko-Jedinstvo BRCKO
1st SEMIFINAL	KAKANJ	OK KAKANJ	2:3	OK Modrica-Optima MODRICA
2nd SEMIFINAL	MODRICA	OK Modrica-Optima MODRICA	3:1	OK KAKANJ

BOSNIA & HERZEGOVINA NATIONAL CUP 2005/06 - won by OK Kakanj

MATCH	VENUE	TEAM	RESULT	TEAM
16-final	MOSTAR	OK MOSTAR	0:3	OK KAKANJ
8-final	BRCKO	OK KAKANJ	3:0	OK Bosna SARAJEVO
4-final	BRCKO	OK KAKANJ	3:0	OK Student PALE
SEMIFINAL	MODRICA	Radnik-Elvaco BIJELJINA	2:3	OK KAKANJ
FINAL	MODRICA	OK Modrica-Optima MODRICA	1:3	OK KAKANJ

OK Kakanj win 2005/2006 Bosnia & Herzegovina National Cup:

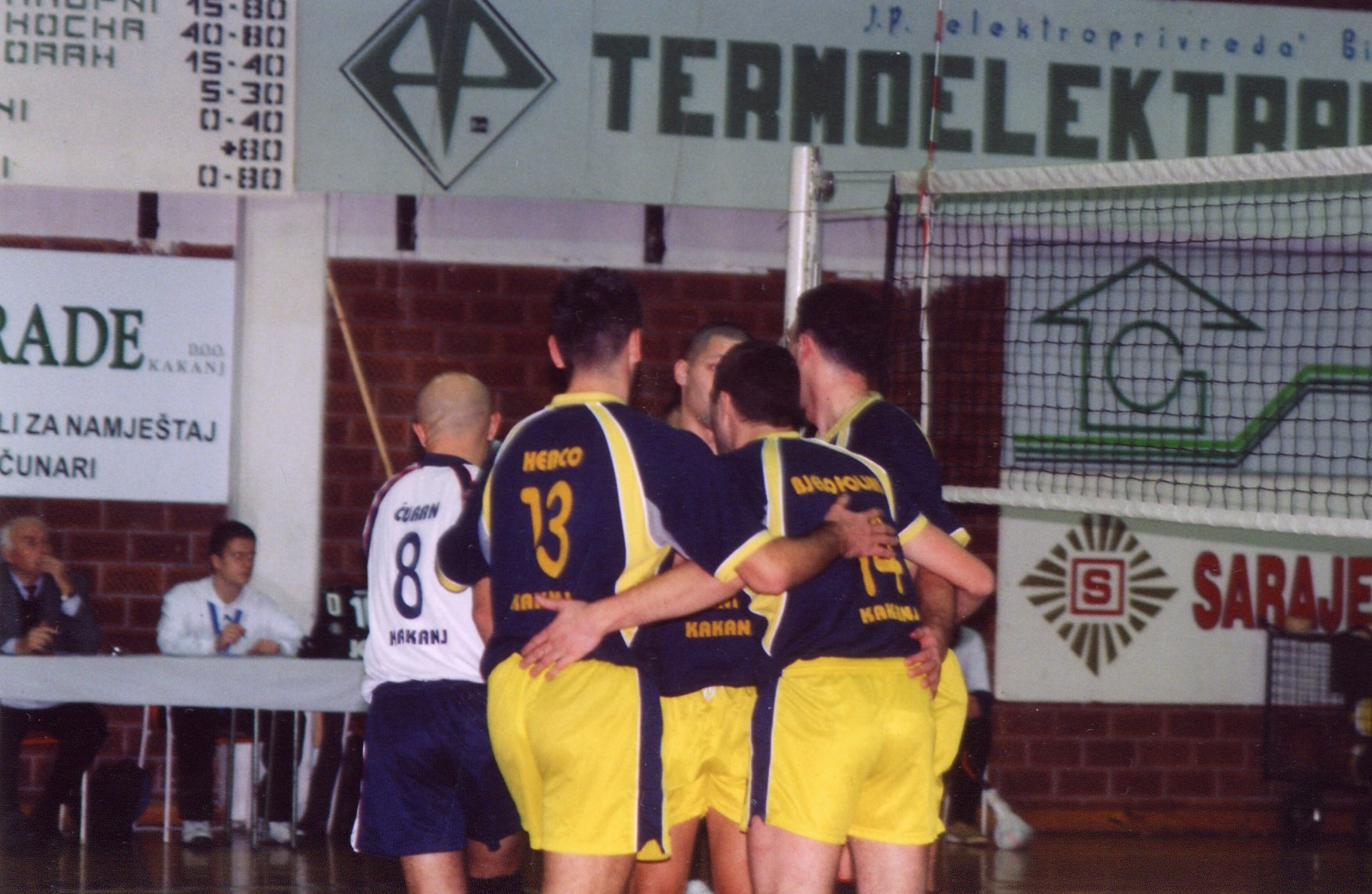
OK Kakanj - OK Gradina Ingram Srebrenik 3:2

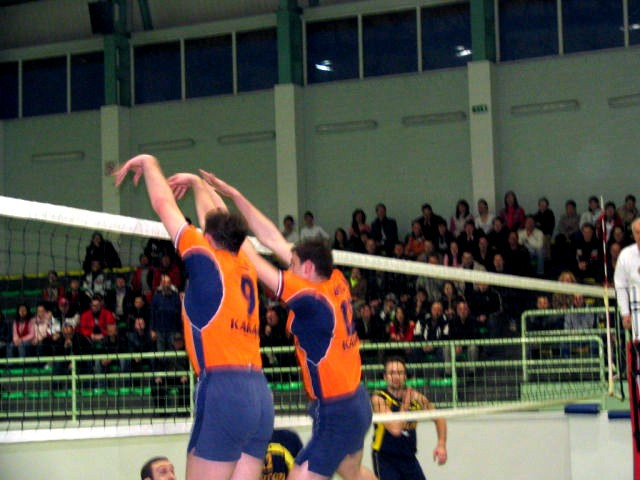
OK Gradina Srebrenik - OK Kakanj 0:3 (Brakmic - Delic )

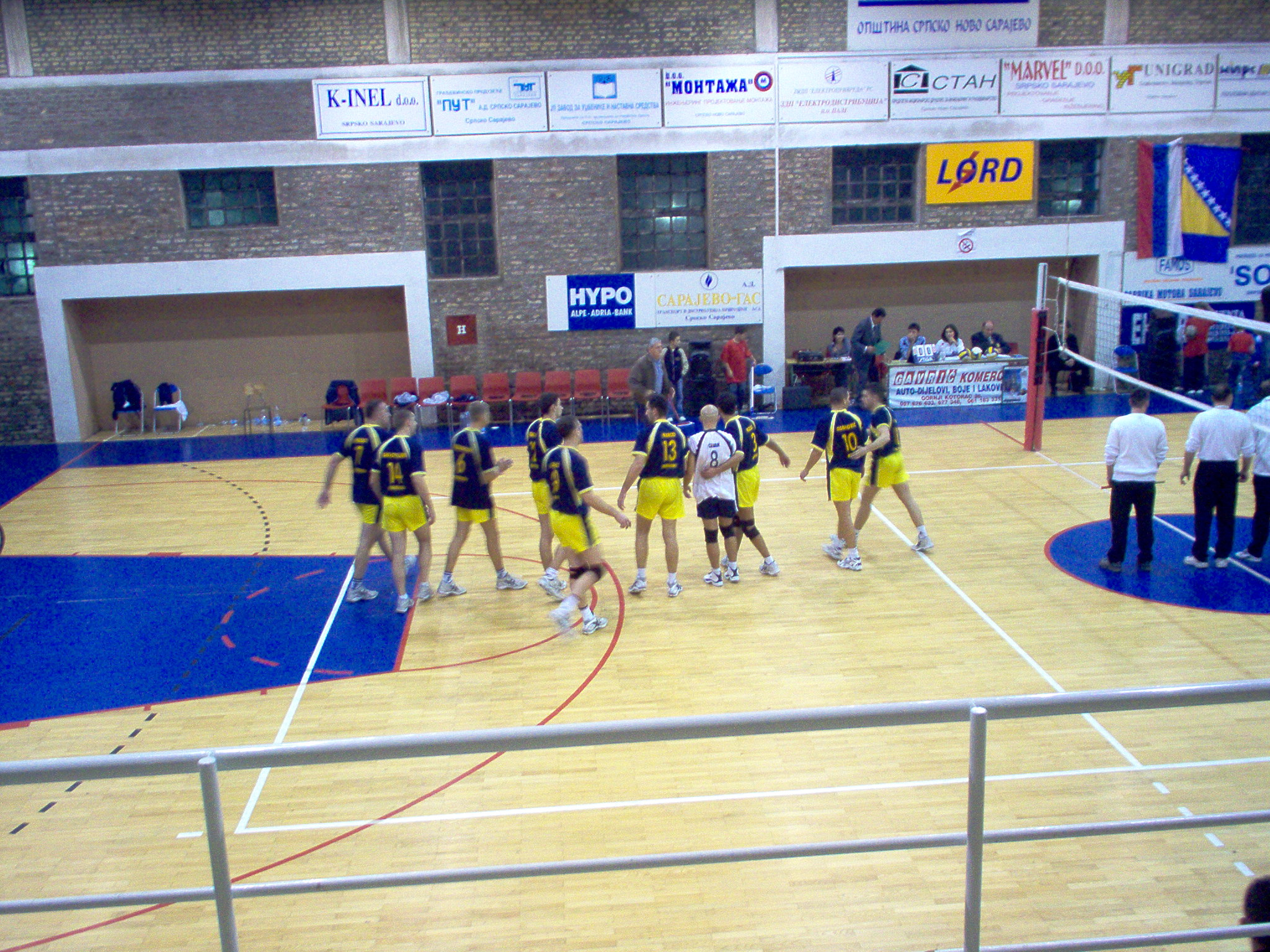
OK Student PALE - OK Kakanj 0:3

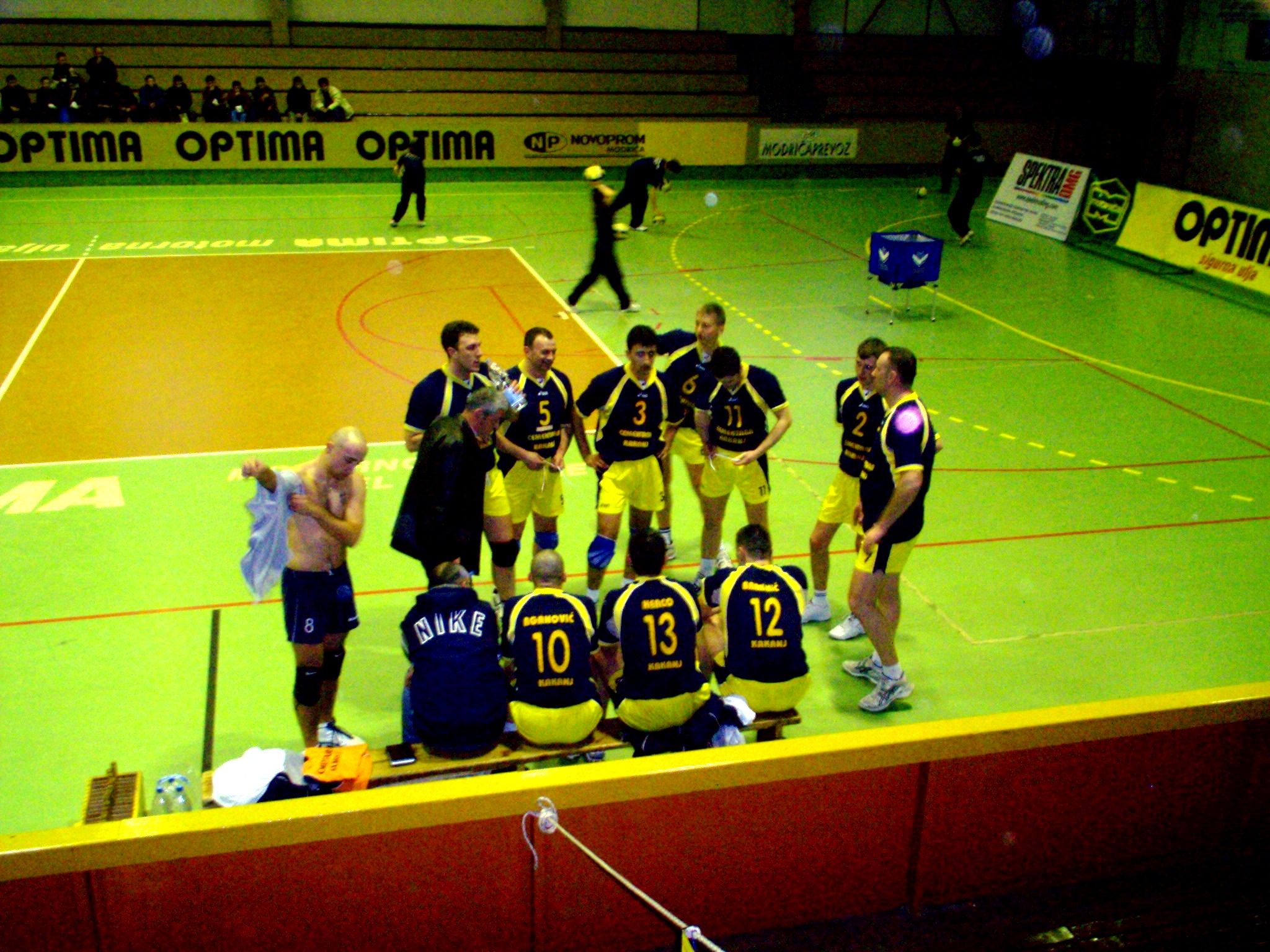
Cup 05/06, OK Kakanj - OK Radnik 3:2

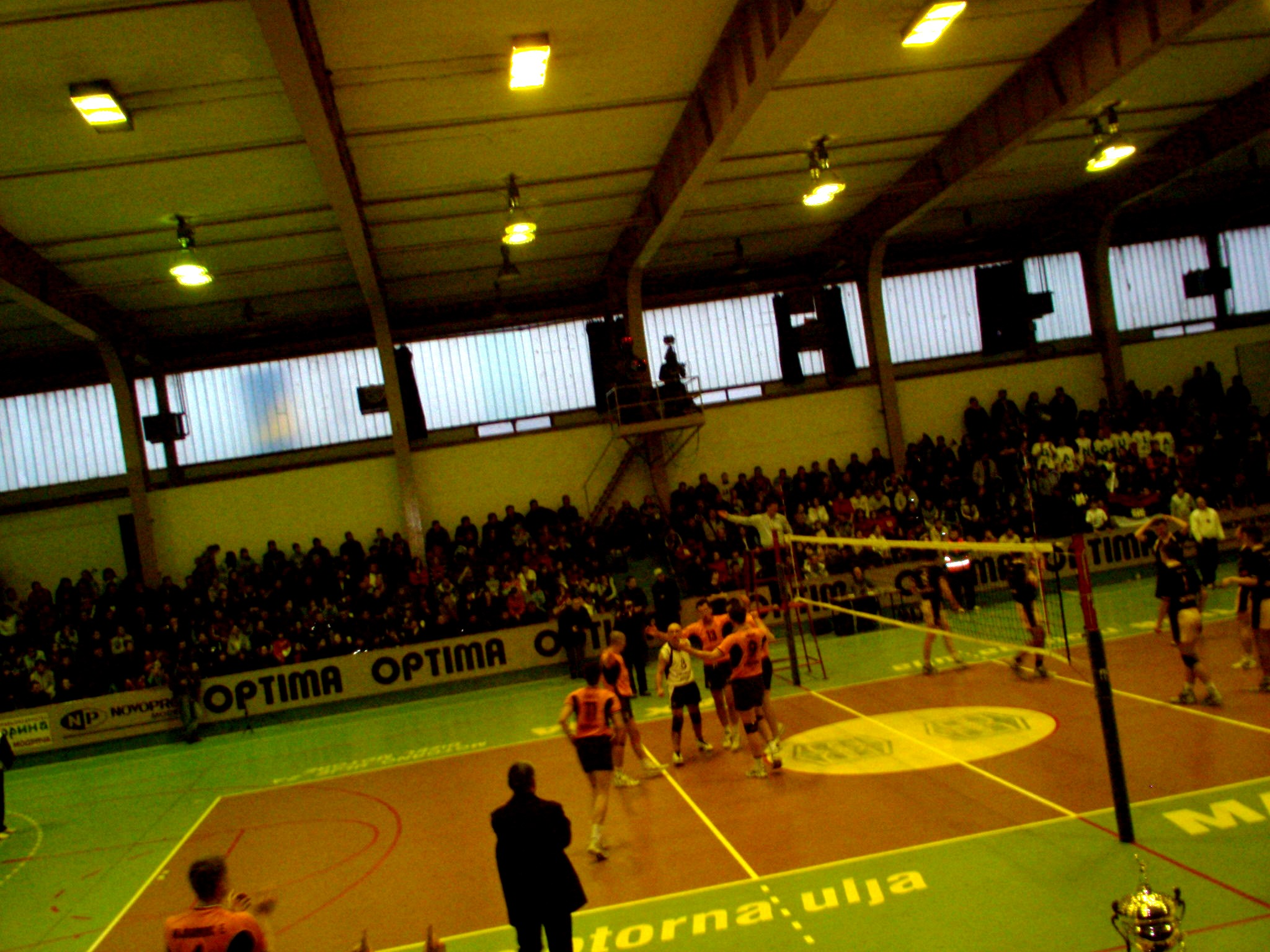
CUP FINAL 2006 - Modrica-Kakanj 1:3

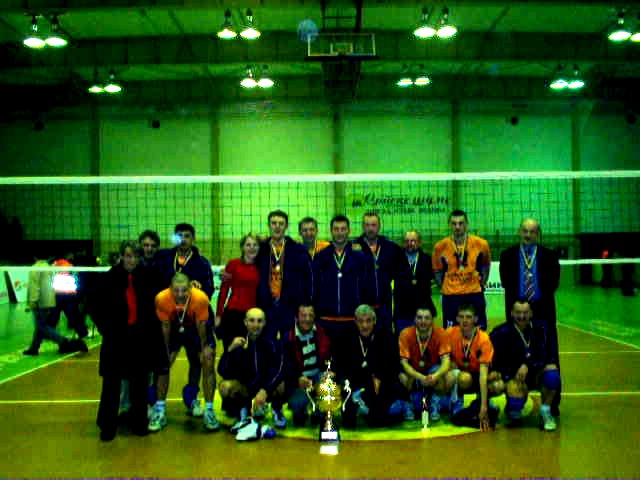
Cup 05/06, WINNERS

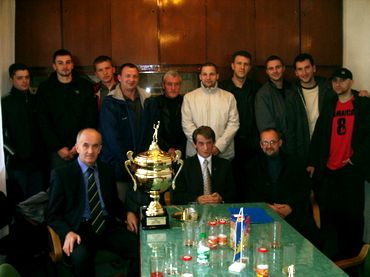
Cup 05/06

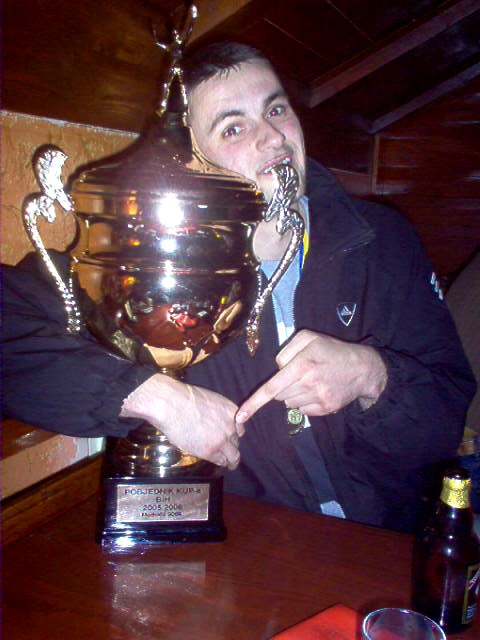
Amir Brakmic

=== Season 2004-2005 ===
Team Squad 2004-2005

No.	Name	Country	Position
3	Salih Fazlic	Bosnian	Middleplayer
4	Aldin Spahovic	Bosnian	Opposite
5	Haris Zolota	Bosnian	Spiker
6	Emir Bajramovic	Bosnian	Middleplayer
7	Nedzmin Kozlo	Bosnian	Middleplayer
8	Amir Curan	Bosnian	Libero
9	Rijad Delic	Bosnian	Opposite
10	Almir Aganovic	Bosnian	Spiker
11	Ermin Lepic	Bosnian	Setter
12	Amir Brakmic	Bosnian	Middleplayer
13	Adnan Herco	Bosnian	Spiker
14	Damir Bjelopoljak	Bosnian	Setter

PREMIER LEAGUE OF VOLLEYBALL OF BOSNIA AND HERZEGOVINA 2004/2005 - OK Kakanj finished in 1st place and won the 2004/2005 Championship

DATE	VENUE	TEAM	R	TEAM
02.10.2004	KAKANJ	OK KAKANJ	3:O	Gradina SREBRENIK
10.10.2004	ODZAK	OK KAKANJ	3:0	Napredak ODZAK
16.10.2004	KAKANJ	OK KAKANJ	3:0	OK ZENICA
30.10.2004	KALESIJA	OK KAKANJ	3:0	OK Bosna KALESIJA
03.11.2004	KAKANJ	OK KAKANJ	3:0	OK MAGLAJ
06.11.2004	ODZAK	OK KAKANJ	3:0	HOK DOMALJEVAC
13.11.2004	KAKANJ	OK KAKANJ	3:0	HOK CAPLJINA
20.11.2004	KAKANJ	OK KAKANJ	3:0	OK BRCKO
27.11.2004	SARAJEVO	OK KAKANJ	2:3	OK Bosna SARAJEVO
04.12.2004	KAKANJ	OK KAKANJ	3:0	HOK BALEGOVAC
11.12.2004	LUKAVAC	OK KAKANJ	3:0	OK 7 LUKAVAC
05.02.2005	SREBRENIK	OK KAKANJ	3:1	OK Gradina SREBRENIK
12.02.2005	KAKANJ	OK KAKANJ	3:2	OK Napredak ODZAK
19.02.2005	ZENICA	OK KAKANJ	3:0	OK ZENICA
09.03.2005	KAKANJ	OK KAKANJ	3:0	OK Bosna SARAJEVO
16.03.2006	KAKANJ	OK KAKANJ	3:0	HOK DOMALJEVAC
19.03.2006	KAKANJ	OK KAKANJ	3:0	HOK CAPLJINA
23.03.2005	BRCKO	OK KAKANJ	2:3	OK BRCKO
26.03.2005	KAKANJ	OK KAKANJ	3:1	OK Bosna SARAJEVO
30.03.2005	ODZAK	OK KAKANJ	3:0	HOK BALEGOVAC
02.04.2005	KAKANJ	OK KAKANJ	3:0	OK 7 LUKAVAC

Final rankings 2004/2005

PLACE	TEAM
1.	OK KAKANJ
2.	OK BRCKO
3.	OK Bosna SARAJEVO
4.	OK Napredak ODZAK
5.	OK 7 LUKAVAC
6.	OK Gradina SREBRENIK
7.	OK ZENICA
8.	HOK DOMALJEVAC
9.	HOK CAPLJINA
10.	HOK BALEGOVAC

Championship Play-off 2004/05

MATCH	VENUE	TEAM	RESULT	TEAM
1st semifinal	ODZAK	OK Napredak ODZAK	2:3	OK KAKANJ
2nd semifinal	KAKANJ	OK KAKANJ	2:3	OK Napredak ODZAK
3rd semifinal	KAKANJ	OK KAKANJ	3:1	OK Napredak ODZAK
1st final	BRCKO	OK BRCKO	1:3	OK KAKANJ
2nd final	KAKANJ	OK KAKANJ	2:3	OK BRCKO
3rd final	KAKANJ	OK KAKANJ	3:0	OK BRCKO

BOSNIA & HERZEGOVINA NATIONAL CUP 2004/05 - OK Kakanj lost in Final

MATCH	VENUE	TEAM	RESULT	TEAM
8-final	SREBRENIK	OK Gradina SREBRENIK	0:3	OK KAKANJ
4-final	KAKANJ	OK KAKANJ	3:0	OK Sporting BANJA LUKA
SEMIFINAL	KALESIJA	OK Bosna KALESIJA	0:3	OK KAKANJ
FINAL	BRCKO	OK Bosna SARAJEVO	3:0	OK KAKANJ

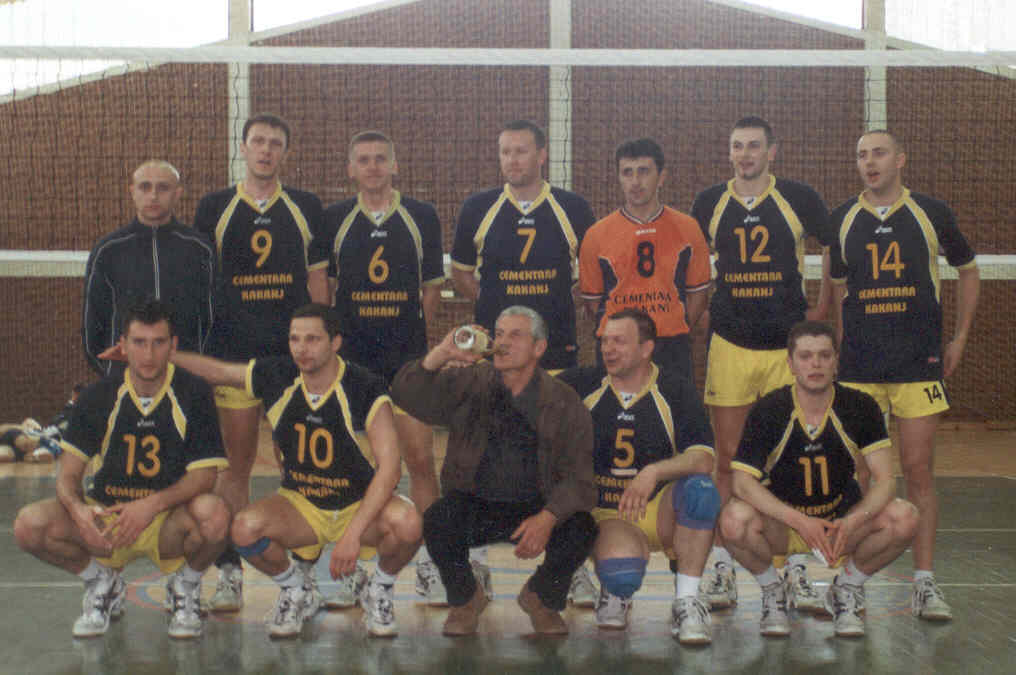
OK Kakanj - Champions of Bosnia and Herzegovina 2004/05

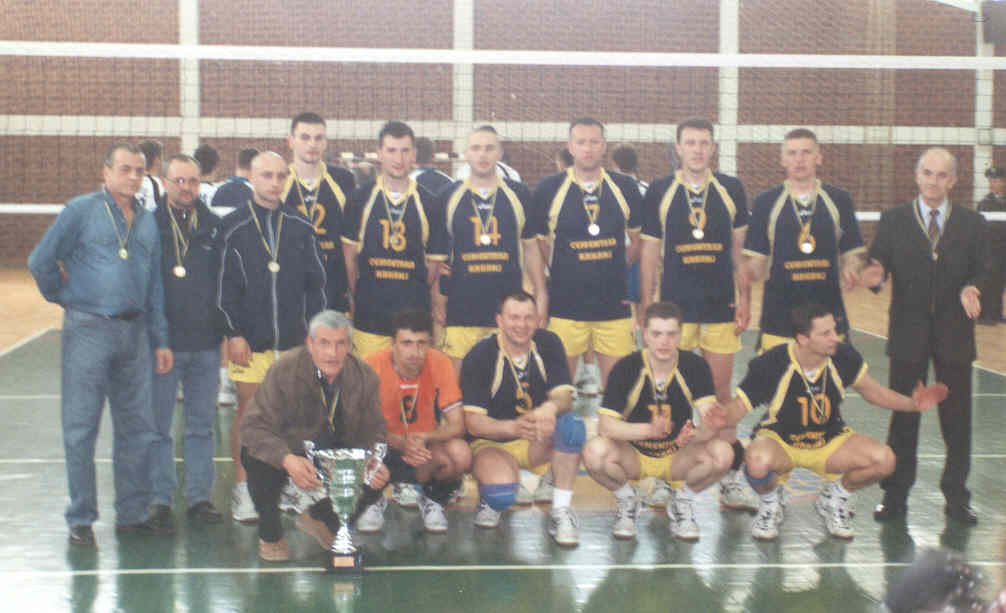
OK Kakanj - Champions of Bosnia and Herzegovina 2004/05

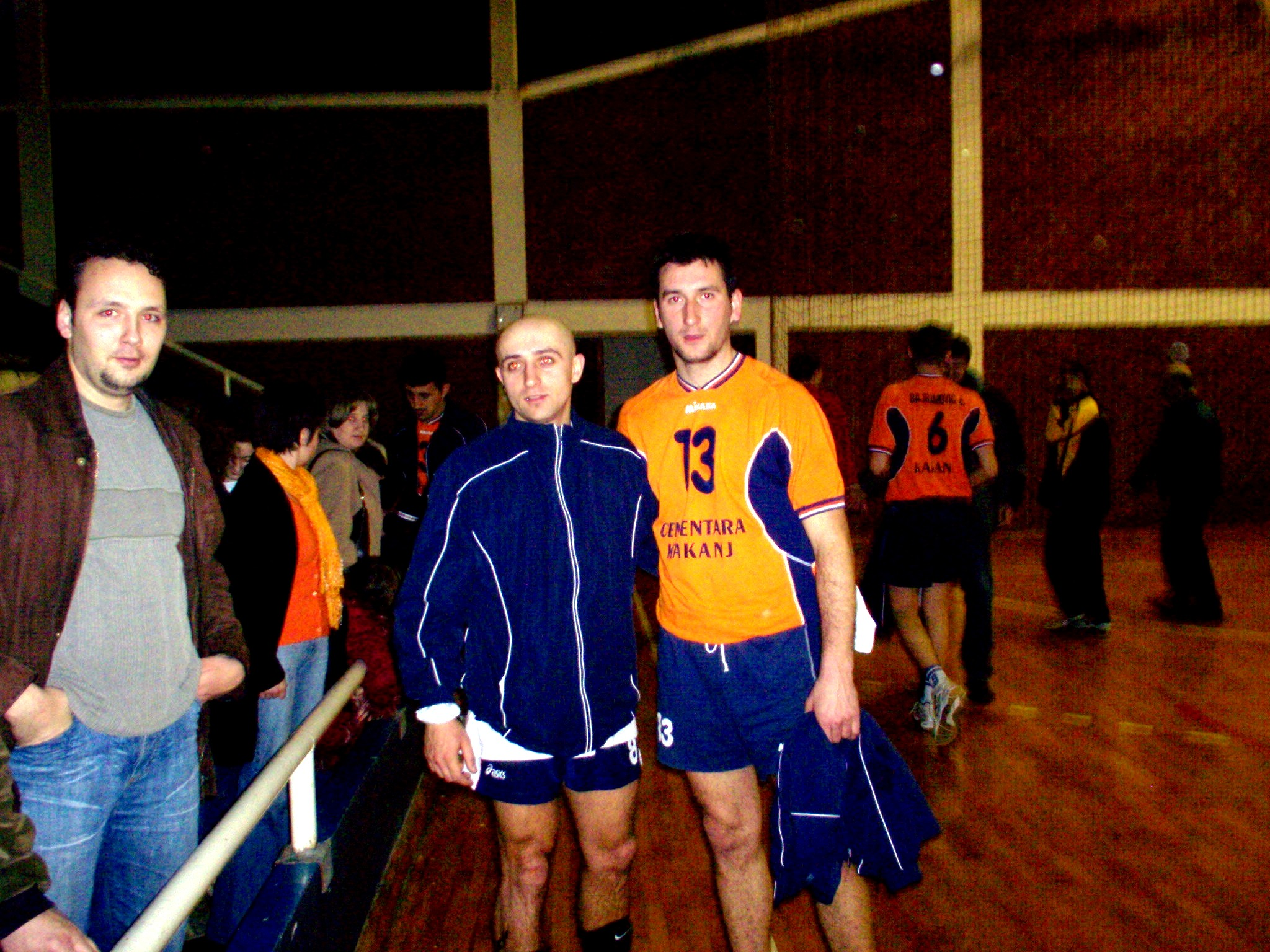
Adnan Herco & Amir Ćuran

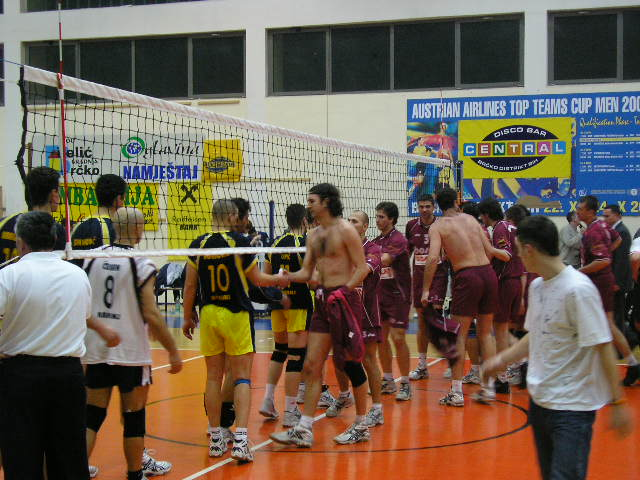
OK Bosna Sarajevo - OK Kakanj 3:0, Cup Final 04/05

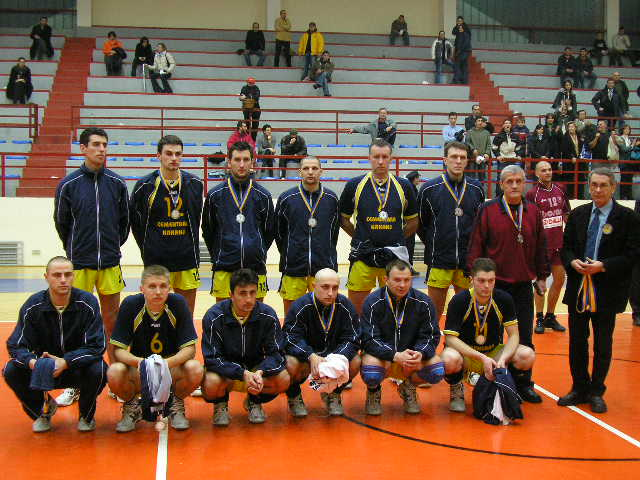
OK Bosna Sarajevo - OK Kakanj 3:0, Cup Final 04/05

=== Season 2003-2004 ===
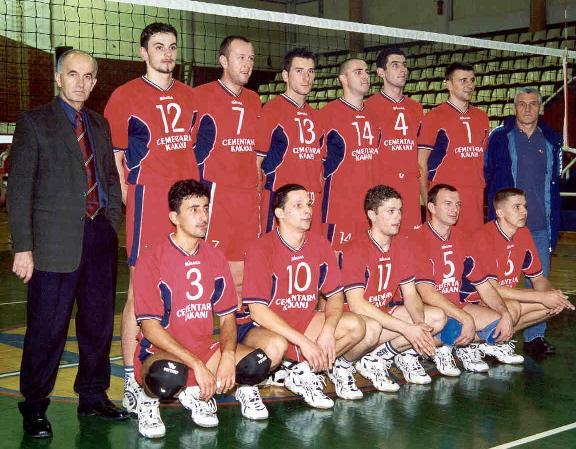
Team Squad 2003-2004

No.	Name	Country	Position
1	Sanjin Bezdrob	Bosnian	Spiker
3	Salih Fazlic	Bosnian	Middleplayer
4	Aldin Spahovic	Bosnian	Opposite
5	Haris Zolota	Bosnian	Spiker
6	Emir Bajramovic	Bosnian	Middleplayer
7	Nedzmin Kozlo	Bosnian	Middleplayer
8	Amir Curan	Bosnian	Libero
9	Rijad Delic	Bosnian	Opposite
10	Almir Aganovic	Bosnian	Spiker
11	Ermin Lepic	Bosnian	Setter
12	Amir Brakmic	Bosnian	Middleplayer
13	Adnan Herco	Bosnian	Spiker
14	Damir Bjelopoljak	Bosnian	Setter

PREMIER LEAGUE OF VOLLEYBALL OF BOSNIA AND HERZEGOVINA 2003/2004 - OK Kakanj finished in 1st place and won the 2003/2004 Championship

DATE	VENUE	TEAM	R	TEAM
18.10.2003	ZENICA	OK KAKANJ	3:0	OK ZENICA
21.10.2003	KAKANJ	OK KAKANJ	3:0	Bosna KALESIJA
01.11.200	MAGLAJ	OK KAKANJ	3:0	OK MAGLAJ
08.11.2003	KAKANJ	OK KAKANJ	3:0	OK Gradina SREBRENIK
15.11.2003	LUKAVAC	OK KAKANJ	3:0	OK 7 LUKAVAC
22.11.2003	KAKANJ	OK KAKANJ	3:0	OK CAPLJINA
29.11.2003	KAKANJ	OK KAKANJ	3:1	OK BRCKO
02.12.2003	ODZAK	OK KAKANJ	2:3	Napredak ODZAK
05.12.2003	KAKANJ	OK KAKANJ	3:0	Bosna SARAJEVO
07.02.2004	KAKANJ	OK KAKANJ	3:0	OK ZENICA
14.02.2004	KALESIJA	OK KAKANJ	2:3	OK Bosna KALESIJA
21.02.2004	KAKANJ	OK KAKANJ	3:0	OK MAGLAJ
07.03.2004	SREBRENIK	OK KAKANJ	3:0	OK Gradina SREBRENIK
13.03.2004	KAKANJ	OK KAKANJ	3:0	OK 7 LUKAVAC
24.03.2006	CAPLJINA	OK KAKANJ	3:0	OK CAPLJINA
31.03.2004	BRCKO	OK KAKANJ	0:3	OK BRCKO
03.04.2004	KAKANJ	OK KAKANJ	3:0	OK Napredak ODZAK
08.04.2004	SARAJEVO	OK KAKANJ	3:1	OK Bosna SARAJEVO

Final rankings 2003/2004

PLACE	TEAM
1.	OK KAKANJ
2.	Bosna SARAJEVO
3.	OK BRCKO
4.	Napredak ODZAK
5.	OK Bosna KALESIJA
6.	OK 7 LUKAVAC
7.	OK Gradina SREBRENIK
8.	OK ZENICA
9.	OK CAPLJINA
10.	OK MAGLAJ

Championship Play-off 2003/04

MATCH	VENUE	TEAM	RESULT	TEAM
1st SEMIFINAL	ODZAK	Napredak ODZAK	3:1	OK KAKANJ
2nd SEMIFINAL	KAKANJ	OK KAKANJ	3:1	Napredak ODZAK
3rd SEMIFINAL	KAKANJ	OK KAKANJ	3:0	Napredak ODZAK
1st FINAL	SARAJEVO	Bosna SARAJEVO	1:3	OK KAKANJ
2nd FINAL	KAKANJ	OK KAKANJ	1:3	Bosna SARAJEVO
3rd FINAL	KAKANJ	OK KAKANJ	3:0	Bosna SARAJEVO

BOSNIA & HERZEGOVINA NATIONAL CUP 2003/04 - won by OK Kakanj

MATCH	VENUE	TEAM	RESULT	TEAM
4-final	LUKAVAC	OK 7 LUKAVAC	0:3	OK KAKANJ
SEMIFINAL	SARAJEVO	Bosna SARAJEVO	1:3	OK KAKANJ
FINAL	SARAJEVO	OK BRCKO	0:3	OK KAKANJ

OK Kakanj - top teams Geneva 2004/05
