= RSD Sloboda Tuzla =

Multi-sport club in Bosnia and Herzegovina

- Full name: Radničko sportsko društvo Sloboda Tuzla
- Nicknames: Crveno Crni
- Short name: RSD “Sloboda”
- Sports: 13 clubs in 13 different sports
- Founded: 1919; 106 years ago
- Based in: Tuzla, Bosnia and Herzegovina
- Arena: SKPC Mejdan Tuzla
- Stadium: Tušanj City Stadium
- Colors: Red and black
- Managing director: Aid Berbić
- Official fan club: Fukare Tuzla
- Website: rsdsloboda.ba

Radničko Sportsko Društvo Sloboda, (transl. Workers Sport Society Sloboda), commonly abbreviated as RSD Sloboda Tuzla, is a multi-sport club based in Tuzla, Bosnia and Herzegovina. Sloboda is mostly male sports society, its female counterpart is Jedinstvo Tuzla.

== History ==
Society was founded in 1927, but its first and base member football club was founded in 1919. Society was founded so to organize the existing sports clubs in Tuzla. Sloboda has 13 different sports teams and one musical section.

== Clubs ==
There are 14 competitive clubs that are part of RSD Sloboda.

Sport	Team Name	Founded	Home ground
Football	Fudbalski klub Sloboda	1919	Tušanj City Stadium
Music	Tamburaška sekcija	1919	
Basketball	Omladinski Košarkaški Klub Sloboda	1946	Mejdan Sports Hall
Swimming	Plivački klub Sloboda	1947	Hotel Tuzla Swimming pool
Athletics	Atletski Klub Sloboda Tehnograd	1948	Tušanj City Stadium
Boxing	Bokserski Klub Sloboda	1952	Mejdan Sports Hall
Tennis	Teniski Klub Sloboda	1950	Slana Banja Tennis Courts
Bowling	Kuglaški Klub Sloboda	1951	Mejdan Sports Hall
Handball	Rukometni Klub Sloboda	1959	Mejdan Sports Hall
Wrestling	Hrvački klub Sloboda	1977	Mejdan Sports Hall
Chess	Tuzlanski Šahovski Klub Sloboda	1970	
Karate	Karate Klub Sloboda	1994	Mejdan Sports Hall
Volleyball	Odbojkaški Klub Sloboda	2009	Mejdan Sports Hall
Rhythmic Gymnastics	Klub ritmičko sportske gimnastike Sloboda	2009	Ismet Mujezinović Gymnasium

== Famous athletes ==
=== Olympic athletes ===
Name	Sport	Olympiad	Country
Vinko Galušić	Athletics	Montreal 1976	Yugoslavia
Marijan Beneš	Boxing	Montreal 1976	Yugoslavia
Mirza Delibašić	Basketball	Montreal 1976^{1}, Moscow 1980^{2}	Yugoslavia
Dževad Šećerbegović	Football	Moscow 1980	Yugoslavia
Cvijan Milošević	Football	Seoul 1988	Yugoslavia
Mirko Mihić	Football	Seoul 1988	Yugoslavia
Dragan Perić	Athletics	Barcelona 1992, Atlanta 1996, Sydney 2000, Athens 2004	Yugoslavia; Serbia
Zlatan Saračević	Athletics	Barcelona 1992	Bosnia and Herzegovina
Kada Delić	Athletics	Barcelona 1992, Atlanta 1996	Bosnia and Herzegovina
Damir Mulaomerović	Basketball	Atlanta 1996	Croatia
Dijana Kojić	Athletics	Sydney 2000	Bosnia and Herzegovina
Jasminka Guber	Athletics	Athens 2004	Bosnia and Herzegovina
Jasmin Salihović	Athletics	Athens 2004	Bosnia and Herzegovina
Nedim Nišić	Swimming	Beijing 2008	Bosnia and Herzegovina
Ensar Hajder	Swimming	London 2012	Bosnia and Herzegovina

- 1 Won silver medal
- 2 Won golden medal

=== Other athletes ===
- Mirza Teletović, basketball
- Damir Mršić, basketball
- Jasmin Hukić, basketball
- Mirza Begić, basketball
- Elmedin Kikanović, basketball
- Mustafa Hukić, football
- Asim Pars, basketball
- Alen Ovčina, handball
- Nedžad Verlašević, football
- Fahrudin Omerović, football
- Said Husejinović, football
- Muhamed Konjić, football
- Mirsad Dedić, football
- Rizah Mešković, football
- Mirza Mešić, football
- Mesud Nalić, football
