= Furusjö Alliance Church =

Coordinates: 57.9287°N 13.9603°E

- Furusjö allianskyrka
- Furusjö Alliance Church
- Location: Furusjö
- Country: Sweden
- Denomination: Swedish Alliance Mission

History
- Consecrated: 28 November 1920

Administration
- Parish: Furusjö

The Furusjö Alliance Church (Swedish: Furusjö allianskyrka) is a church building in Furusjö, Sweden. It was opened on 28 November 1920 and belongs to the Swedish Alliance Mission.
