= Baskarp =

Baskarp Baskarp
- Location within Sweden
- Coordinates: 58.017°N 14.145°E
- Country: Sweden
- County: Jönköping
- Municipality: Habo

Population (2010)
  - Total: 79
- Time zone: UTC+1 (CET)
  - Summer (DST): UTC+2 (CEST)

Baskarp is a minor locality in Habo Municipality, Jönköping County, Sweden. As of 2010, it had a population of 79.
