= OK Sloboda Tuzla =

Female volleybalclub

- Founded: 2009; 16 years ago
- Ground: SKPC Mejdan (Capacity: 4,900)
- League: Premier League
- 2020-21: 7th

Uniforms
Home	Away

Odbojkaski Klub Sloboda Tuzla is a female volleyball club from Tuzla, Bosnia and Herzegovina. It currently competes in the Premier League, the top tier volleyball league of Bosnia and Herzegovina. It is part of the RSD Sloboda Tuzla.

== History ==
The club was founded in 2009. In season 2012-13 it won promotion to the top tier league.

== Recent seasons ==
The recent season-by-season performance of the club:

Season	Division	Tier	Position
2014-15	Premier League	I	5th
2015-16	Premier League	I	6th
2016-17	Premier League	I	6th
2017-18	Premier League	I	8th
2018-19	Premier League	I	5th
2019-20	Premier League	I	3rd
2020–21	Premier League	I	7th
2021–22	Premier League	I	7th

== Coaching history ==
- (Bosnia and Herzegovina) Almir Žilić
- (Bosnia and Herzegovina) Nihad Zahirović
- (Bosnia and Herzegovina) Armin Dervišević
