= Habo Church =

Coordinates: 57°53′N 14°01′E

- Habo kyrka
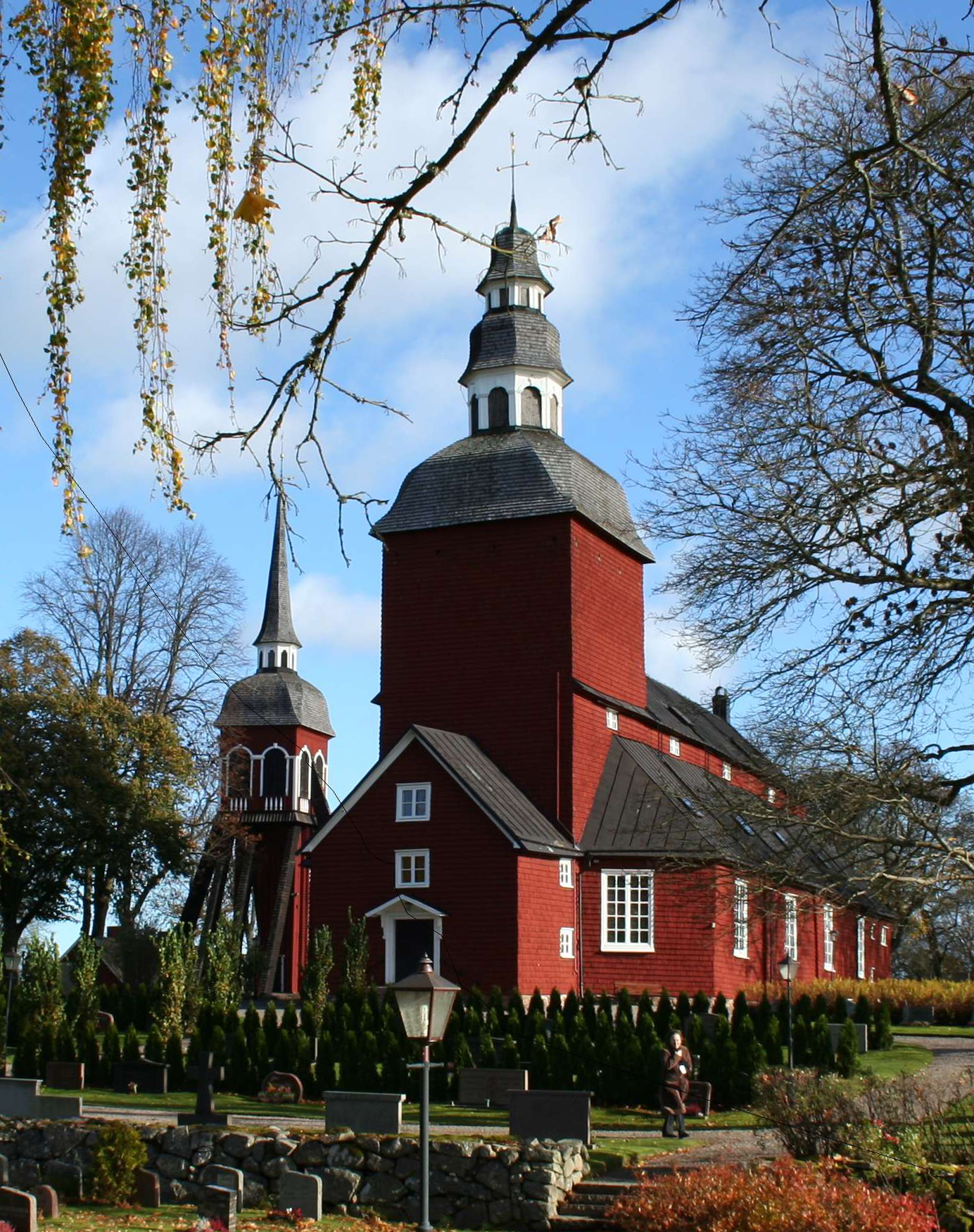
- Habo Church in October 2008
- Habo Church
- Location: Habo
- Country: Sweden
- Denomination: Church of Sweden

History
- Consecrated: 1680

Administration
- Diocese: Skara
- Parish: Habo

Habo Church (Swedish: Habo kyrka) in Habo Parish, Jönköping County, Sweden, is a wooden church building in Habo. It was built in 1680, and received its present appearance in 1723. The church is unique in its architecture, resembling a cathedral although it is built entirely in wood. It is in the form of a basilica, with a high nave and two lower side aisles. The church is nicknamed the "Wooden Cathedral Near Vättern" (Swedish: Träkatedralen vid Vättern).

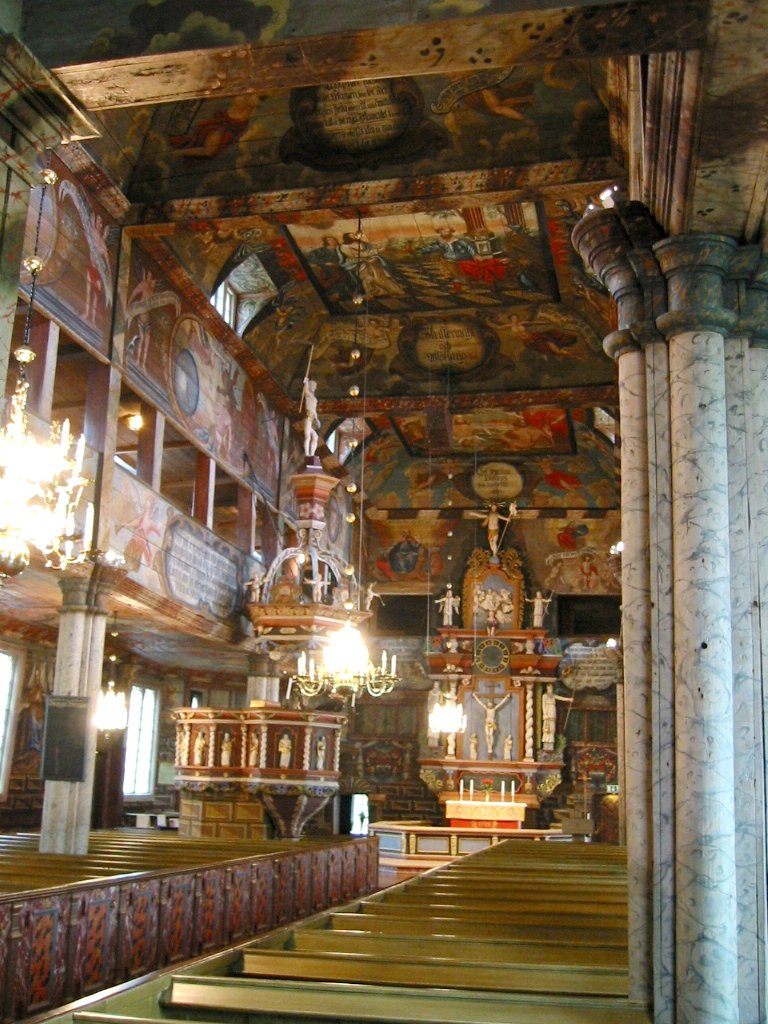
Interior of Habo Church

The interior of the church was painted in 1741–43 by two artists from Jönköping, Johan Kinnerius and Johan Christian Peterson. The paintings illustrate Martin Luther's catechism, summary of his interpretation of the Christian faith.

Habo Church is one of four churches whose pictures were reproduced by the Swedish Post Office in 2002 for a series of Christmas stamps under the rubric "Romantic Churches at Christmastime" (Swedish: Romantiska kyrkkor i juletid). The others were Kiruna Church in the Norrbotten County, Tensta Bell Tower in northern Uppland, and Sundborn Church in Dalarna.
