= Fagerhult Group =

Lighting fixtures company

Fagerhult
- Type: AB
- ISIN: SE0010048884
- Industry: Electrical Equipment & Parts
- Founded: 1945
- Founder: Bertil Svensson
- Area served: Northern Europe, the U.K. and Ireland, Western and Southern Europe, and Africa, Asia, and Pacific
- Website: www.fagerhultgroup.com

Fagerhult Group, AB Fagerhult, is a group of companies that create lighting fixtures with a total of approximately 4,100 employees in 27 countries.

The Group consists of 12 brands: Fagerhult, iGuzzini, Ateljé Lyktan, LTS, Whitecroft Lighting, Designplan Lighting, Eagle Lighting, I-Valo, Arlight, LED Linear, WE-EF and Veko.

AB Fagerhult has an annual turnover of SEK 5.6 billion (2018) and is listed on the Nasdaq Nordic Exchange in Stockholm. In 2020 the Fagerhult Group decided to part ways with its South African company Lighting Innovations, which is now owned by Cape Mountain Concepts (Pty).

== Group Brands ==
Brand	Headoffice	Product areas	Part of the group since	
Fagerhult	Fagerhult, Sweden	Indoor, Retail, Outdoor	1945	One of the largest divisions in the group
Ateljé Lyktan	Åhus, Sweden	Indoor, Outdoor	1974	A design-focused brand for public places.
Whitecroft Lighting	Manchester, UK	Indoor, Retail, Outdoor	2005	Large luminaire manufacturer in the UK market.
Eagle Lighting Australia	Melbourne, Australia	Indoor, Retail, Outdoor	2007	Develops lighting for Australian and New Zealand markets. The offering also includes products from Fagerhult, Design-plan and LED Linear
LTS	Tettnang, Germany	Indoor, Retail	2010	Develops lighting for retail markets.
Designplan Lighting	Sutton, UK	Indoor, Outdoor	2011	Produces lighting for secure environments and the transportation sector, selling primarily in UK market and Germany.
I-Valo	Iittala, Finland	Indoor, Outdoor	2013	Lighting for industrial environments, with a position in the Finnish market.
Arlight	Ankara, Turkey	Indoor, Retail, Outdoor	2014	Produces indoor lighting for the Turkish market
LED Linear	Duisburg, Germany	Indoor, Retail, Outdoor	2016	Develops and manufactures linear LED luminaires for professional environments,
WE-EF	Bispingen, Germany	Outdoor	2017	Designs and manufactures high-end outdoor luminaires
Veko	Schagen, Netherlands	Indoor	2018	Produces LED modules and luminaires with integrated or separate control systems
iGuzzini	Recanati, Italy	Indoor, Retail, Outdoor	2019	The operation in Recanati is supported by manu-facturing in China and Canada

== Business areas ==
=== Collection ===
Architectural applications worldwide

- Ateljé Lyktan
- iGuzzini
- LED Linear
- WE-EF

=== Premium ===
All European markets and for global customers

- Fagerhult
- LTS

=== Professional ===
For selected applications

- Arlight
- Eagle Lighting
- Whitecroft Lighting

=== Infrastructure ===
For critical infrastructure and industrial applications

- Designplan Lighting
- I-Valo
- Veko
