= Ermin Lepić =

Bosnian volleyball player

Personal information
- Full name: Ermin Lepić
- Born: 24 June 1980 (age 46); Kakanj, Bosnia
- Height: 1.83 m (6 ft 0 in)

Volleyball information
- Position: setter
- Current club: OK Sisak
- Number: 11

Career
Years	Teams
1994–2010; 2010–	OK Kakanj; OK Sisak
Honours
Men's Premier League of Volleyball of Bosnia and Herzegovina
Gold medal – first place	2000	Team
Gold medal – first place	2001	Team
Gold medal – first place	2003	Team
Gold medal – first place	2004	Team
Gold medal – first place	2005	Team
Gold medal – first place	2008	Team
National Cup of Bosnia and Herzegovina
Gold medal – first place	1995	Team
Gold medal – first place	1996	Team
Gold medal – first place	1997	Team
Gold medal – first place	2001	Team
Gold medal – first place	2002	Team
Gold medal – first place	2003	Team
Gold medal – first place	2004	Team
Gold medal – first place	2006	Team
Gold medal – first place	2008	Team

Ermin Lepić (known simply as Lepa) is a Bosnian volleyball player, currently playing for OK Sisak, a team in the Croatian Premier Volleyball League Men's Championship ("Superliga") Division, and also an international player for Bosnia and Herzegovina.

Until the end of the 2009–2010 season, Lepić played as setter for OK Kakanj, the Premier League of Volleyball of Bosnia and Herzegovina's most successful volleyball club 1994-2008 and was team captain 2002–2004. In September 2010 he decided not to sign for OK Kakanj again on the terms offered.

While with OK Kakanj he won 6 Championship titles (2000, 2001, 2003, 2004, 2005) and won the National Cup of Bosnia and Herzegovina 9 times (1994, 1995, 1996, 1997, 2001, 2002, 2003, 2004, 2006).
