= Björnhult, Grönestad and Hästebäcken =

Björnhult, Grönestad and Hästebäcken Björnhult, Grönestad och Hästebäcken
- Interactive map of Björnhult, Grönestad and Hästebäcken
- Coordinates: 58.0583°N 14.1917°E
- Swedish county: Jönköping
- Municipalities of Sweden: Habo

Population (2010)
  - Total: 106
- Time zone: UTC+1 (CET)
  - Summer (DST): UTC+2 (CEST)

Björnhult, Grönestad and Hästebäcken (Swedish: Björnhult, Grönestad och Hästebäcken) is a minor locality situated in Habo Municipality in Jönköping County, Sweden. It had 106 inhabitants in 2010. (updated 8 October 2012)
