= Nätebäcken =

Nätebäcken Nätebäcken
- Location within Sweden
- Coordinates: 58.0333°N 14.1667°E
- Country: Sweden
- Swedish county: Jönköping
- Municipalities of Sweden: Habo

Population (2010)
  - Total: 102
- Time zone: UTC+1 (CET)
  - Summer (DST): UTC+2 (CEST)

Nätebäcken is a minor locality situated in Habo Municipality in Jönköping County, Sweden. It had 102 inhabitants in 2010.
