= Västerkärr =

Västerkärr Västerkärr
- Location within Sweden
- Coordinates: 57.8944°N 13.8611°E
- Country: Sweden
- County: Jönköping
- Municipalities of Sweden: Habo

Population (2010)
  - Total: 94
- Time zone: UTC+1 (CET)
  - Summer (DST): UTC+2 (CEST)

Västerkärr is a minor locality situated in Habo Municipality in Jönköping County, Sweden. It had 94 inhabitants in 2010. (updated 8 October 2012)
