= Kostas Zolotas =

Greek mountain guide (1934–2021)

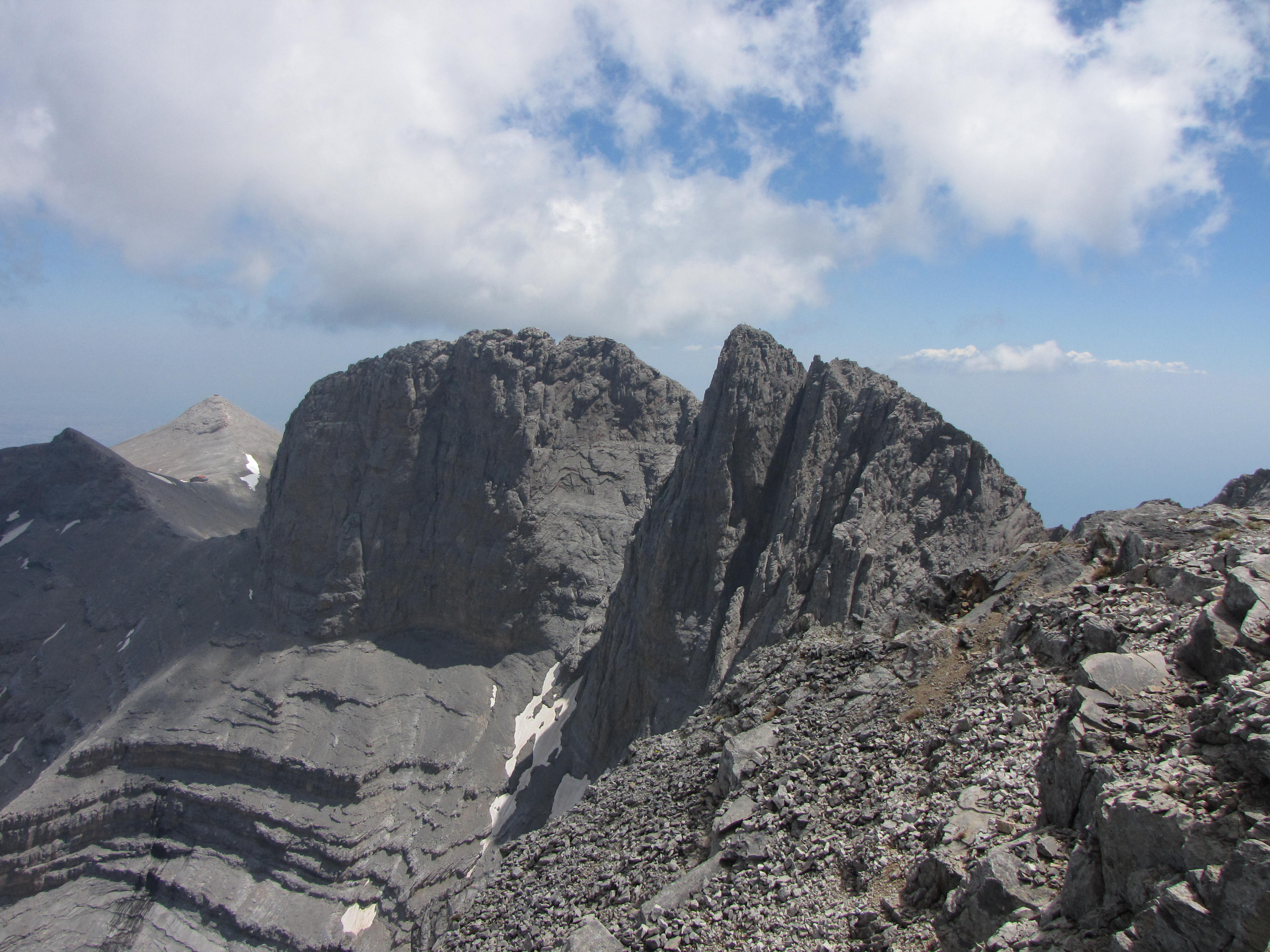
The summits of Mount Olympus. On the right is Mytikas (2917.727 m), on the left Stefani (2909 m)

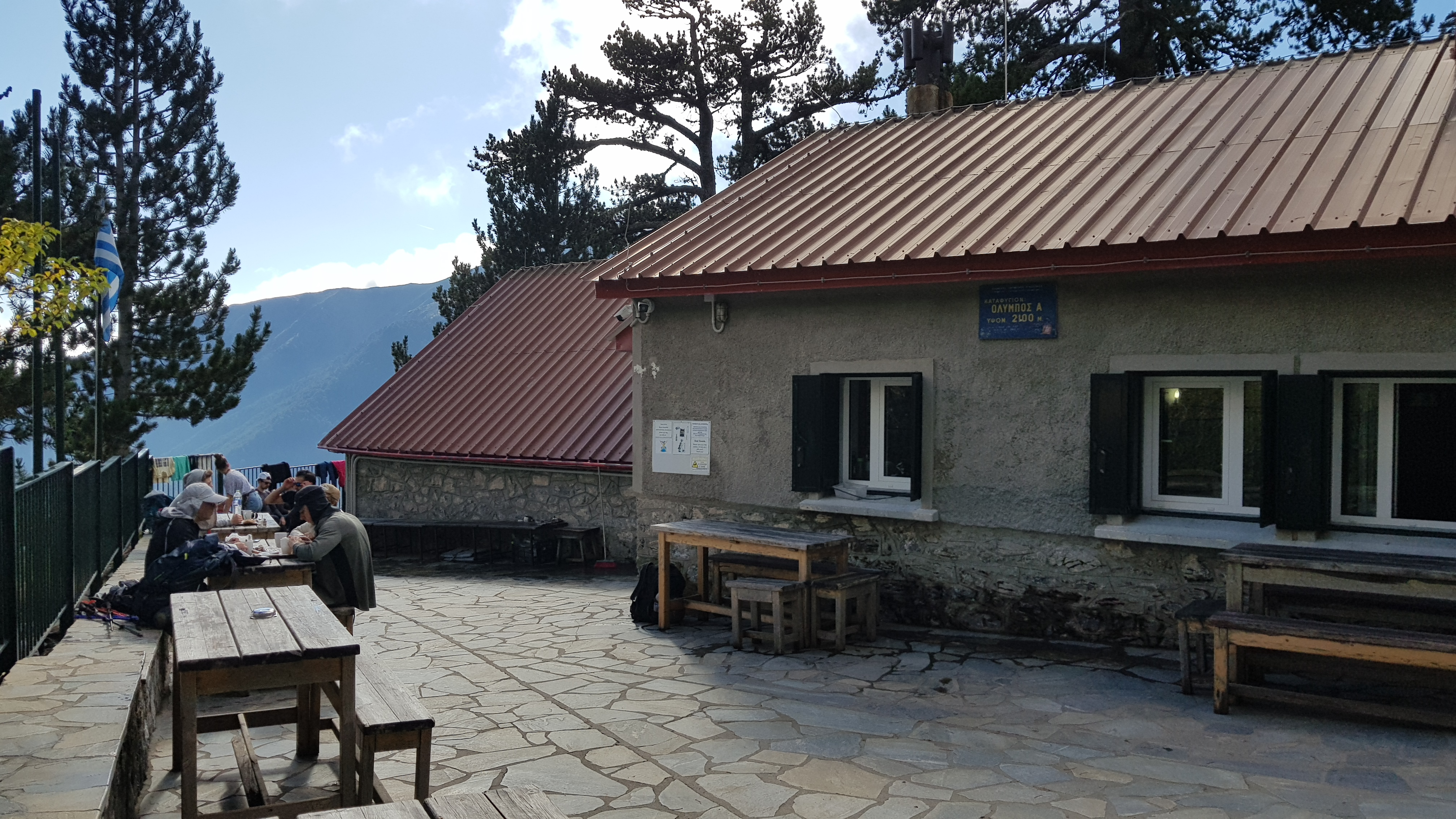
Spilios Agapitos Refuge

Kostas Zolotas (Greek: Κώστας Ζολώτας; 1934 – 14 April 2021) was a Greek mountain guide and hosted the mountain hut Spilios Agapitos. He participated in numerous rescue operations in Mount Olympus (2917.727 m) in Greece.

== Life ==
Zolotas was born in Litochoro, Greece. Early in his youth, he made the acquaintance of Christos Kakkalos, the man who entered first Mytikas, the highest peak of Mount Olympus in 1913. Kakkalos transferred his fascination for the Mountain to the boy, who subsequently spent almost his entire life there. In August 1952, Zolotas climbed Mytikas for the first time. After working in Germany for a few years, he, together with his wife Irmhild, was running the Spilios Agapitos mountain hut from 1960 to 2001. Over these years he expanded the hut, so it can now host 110 guests. The last wing of the facility was completed in 2002 and named after Kostas Zolotas in his honour.

In 1954, Zolotas was officially appointed mountain guide.

Like other mountain hut owners in Olympus, Zolotas was active in the mountain rescue service, and over the years he was involved in more than 110 missions. Due to his stay in Germany, he spoke perfect German. This made it easier for him to establish contact with the German mountain rescue service (Bergwacht) in 1994, which subsequently participated in the training of Greek mountain rescuers.

Kostas Zolotas died at the age of 87 on the afternoon of 14 April 2021 while walking in Olympus.
