= Fagerhult, Habo Municipality =

Fagerhult
- Location within Jönköping Location within Sweden
- Coordinates: 57°49′N 13°56′E
- Country: Sweden
- Province: Västergötland
- County: Jönköping County
- Municipality: Habo Municipality

Area
  - Total: 0.76 km^{2} (0.29 sq mi)

Population (31 December 2010)
  - Total: 316
  - Density: 414/km^{2} (1,070/sq mi)
- Time zone: UTC+1 (CET)
  - Summer (DST): UTC+2 (CEST)

Fagerhult is a locality situated in Habo Municipality, Jönköping County, Sweden with 316 inhabitants in 2010.

The company Fagerhult AB is the core of the community; established in the 1950s. It is the main reason that Fagerhult is as big as it is today. At the beginning the town was the location of a farm called "Fagerhult Farm" at the location of today's community. A picture of early Fagerhult is to be seen in the local Town Hall.

The town also has its own floorball team, called BIFF (Brandstorps Idrotts Förening Fagerhult), which won the Swedish U18 boys national championship in the 2003-2004 season.
