= Habo Wolley =

Volleyball club in Habo, Sweden

- Short name: HW
- Founded: 1987
- Ground: Habo sporthall, Habo, Sweden
- League: Elitserien

Habo Wolley is a volleyball club in Habo in Sweden, established in 1987. The men's team qualified for the Swedish top division, Elitserien, in 1998.
