= Pero Stanić =

Volleyball player and coach (born 1963)

Personal information
- Full name: Pero Stanić
- Nationality: Croatian, Yugoslav
- Born: Osječak
- Hometown: Osječak

Volleyball information
- Position: Middle Blocker

Pero Stanić (born 21 September 1963) is a former professional volleyball player from Bosnia and Herzegovina who was active in Yugoslavia and Croatia. He played for Modriča, OK Vojvodina, HAOK Mladost, Gran Canaria, Almeria and SG Eltmann. Now he is a coach at OK Napredak Odžak.
