= Domaljevac =

Domaljevac Домаљевац
- Village
- Location within Bosnia and Herzegovina
- Coordinates: 45.0628°N 18.5808°E
- Country: Bosnia and Herzegovina
- Entity: Federation of Bosnia and Herzegovina
- Canton: Posavina
- Municipality: Domaljevac-Šamac

Area
  - Total: 8.32 sq mi (21.56 km^{2})

Population (2013)
  - Total: 3,295
  - Density: 395.8/sq mi (152.8/km^{2})
- Time zone: UTC+1 (CET)
  - Summer (DST): UTC+2 (CEST)

Domaljevac (Serbian Cyrillic: Домаљевац) is a village located in Domaljevac-Šamac municipality in Posavina Canton of the Federation of Bosnia and Herzegovina, an entity of Bosnia and Herzegovina.

== Demographics ==
According to the 2013 census, its population was 3,295.

Ethnicity in 2013
Ethnicity	Number	Percentage
Croats	3,248	98.6%
Serbs	16	0.5%
Bosniaks	14	0.4%
other/undeclared	17	0.5%
Total	3,295	100%
