= Fiskebäck =

Fiskebäck Fiskebäck
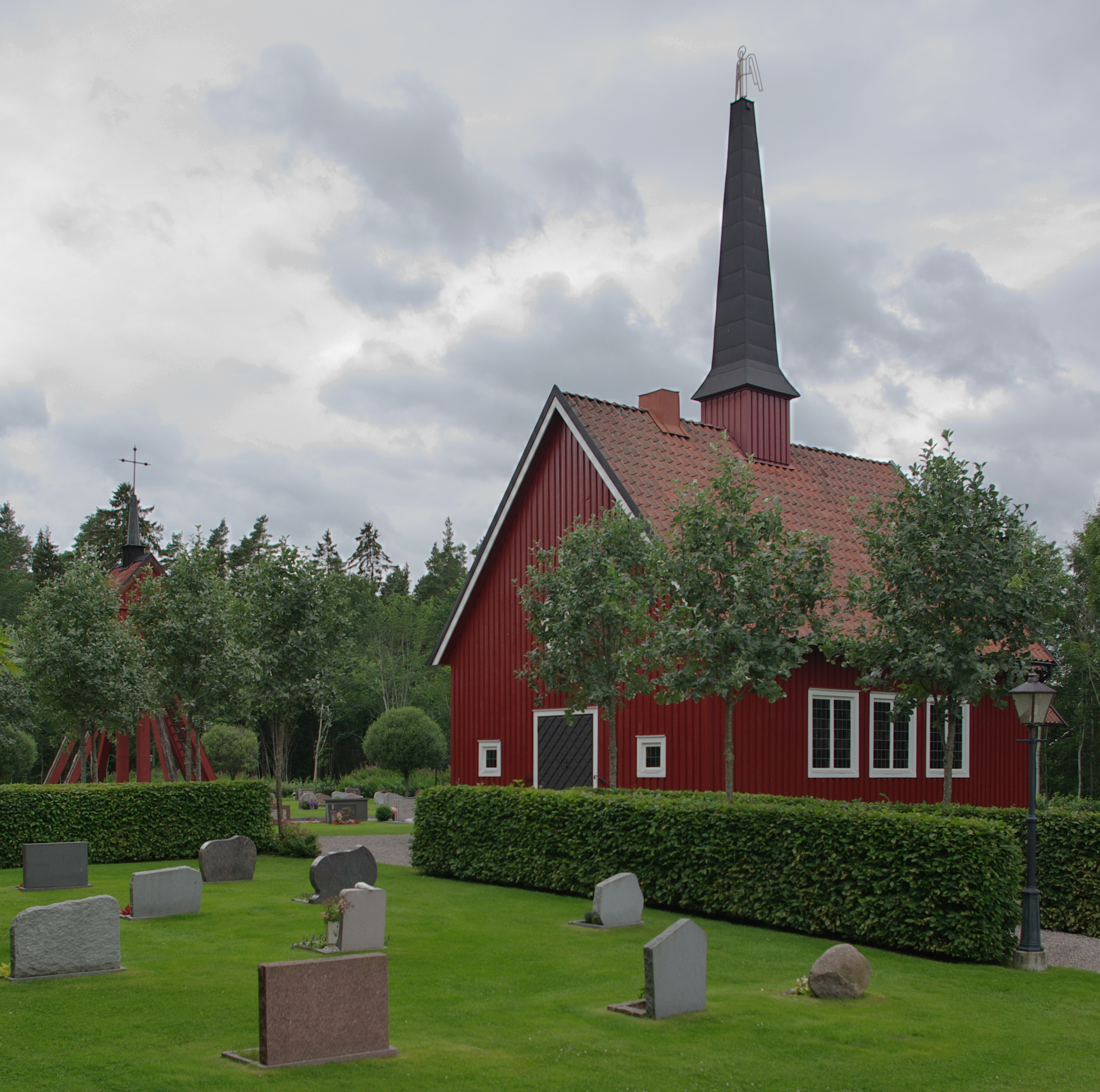
- Fiskebäck Chapel

- Location within Sweden
- Coordinates: 57.8889°N 14.1028°E
- Country: Sweden
- County: Jönköping
- Municipality: Habo

Population (2010)
  - Total: 130
- Time zone: UTC+1 (CET)
  - Summer (DST): UTC+2 (CEST)

Fiskebäck is a minor locality situated in Habo Municipality in Jönköping County, Sweden. It had 130 inhabitants in 2010. (updated 8 October 2012)
