= Almir Aganović =

Bosnian volleyball player

Personal information
- Full name: Almir Aganović
- Born: 1973 (age 52–53); Kakanj, Bosnia
- Height: 1.88 m (6 ft 2 in)

Volleyball information
- Position: Spiker
- Current club: OK Kakanj

Career
Years	Teams
1986-1992; 1993-1996; 1997-2007; 2007-2008; 2008-200	OK Kakanj; NURNBERG; OK Kakanj; OK Napredak Odzak; OK Kakanj

National team
1997–2008	Bosnia
Honours
Men's Premier League of Volleyball of Bosnia and Herzegovina
Gold medal – first place	2000	Team
Gold medal – first place	2001	Team
Gold medal – first place	2003	Team
Gold medal – first place	2004	Team
Gold medal – first place	2005	Team
Gold medal – first place	2007	OK Napredak Odzak
Gold medal – first place	2008	Team
National Cup of Bosnia and Herzegovina
Gold medal – first place	1994	Team
Gold medal – first place	1995	Team
Gold medal – first place	1996	Team
Gold medal – first place	1997	Team
Gold medal – first place	2001	Team
Gold medal – first place	2002	Team
Gold medal – first place	2003	Team
Gold medal – first place	2004	Team
Gold medal – first place	2006	Team
Gold medal – first place	2008	Team

Almir Aganović is a Bosnian volleyball player at the highest national level.

Almir Aganović has played for most of his career with OK Kakanj, Bosnia's most successful professional volleyball club. With OK Kakanj he won the Premier League of Volleyball of Bosnia and Herzegovina 7 times, and National Cup of Bosnia and Herzegovina 10 times. He was captain of the OK Kakanj team which won the 2009-2010 national championship. In 2011 he captained OK Kakanj in the club's 13th National Cup success. He has also won the Premier League of Volleyball of Bosnia and Herzegovina championship once with OK Napredak Odzak.

He plays as a spiker.
