= Haris Zolota =

Bosnian volleyball player (born 1970)

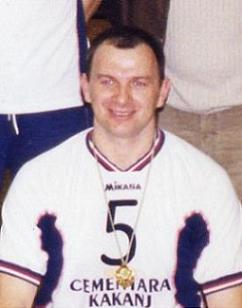

Personal information
- Full name: Haris Zolota
- Born: 7 August 1970 (age 56); Sarajevo, Bosnia and Herzegovina
- Height: 1.89 m (6 ft 2 in)

Volleyball information
- Position: Spiker
- Current club: -

Career
Years	Teams
1986-1994; 1994-1997; 1997-1999; 1999-2006	OK Bosna; OK Dobrinja; OK Sinpos; OK Kakanj

National team
1992–2005	Bosnia and Herzegovina
Honours
Men's Premier League of Volleyball of Bosnia and Herzegovina
Gold medal – first place	1998	Team
Gold medal – first place	2000	Team
Gold medal – first place	2001	Team
Gold medal – first place	2003	Team
Gold medal – first place	2004	Team
Gold medal – first place	2005	Team
National CUP of Bosnia and Herzegovina
Gold medal – first place	1998	Team
Gold medal – first place	1999	Team
Gold medal – first place	2001	Team
Gold medal – first place	2002	Team
Gold medal – first place	2003	Team
Gold medal – first place	2004	Team
Gold medal – first place	2006	Team

Haris Zolota is a Bosnian volleyball player at national league level and also an international player for Bosnia and Herzegovina.

With OK Sinpos SAB BANKA he won the Premier League of Volleyball of Bosnia and Herzegovina title (1998) and the National Cup of Bosnia and Herzegovina twice (1998, 1999).

With OK Kakanj he won the Premier League of Volleyball of Bosnia and Herzegovina 5 times (2000, 2001, 2003, 2004, 2005) and the National Cup of Bosnia and Herzegovina 5 times (2001, 2002, 2003, 2004, 2006).

Zolota spent most of his career (1994–2010) playing for OK Kakanj, the Premier League of Volleyball of Bosnia and Herzegovina's most successful volleyball club and he was a team captain in 2001–2006. He left the club at the end of the 2009–2010 season. He played as Spiker/Opposite.

.
