= Habo =

Town in Jönköping County, Sweden

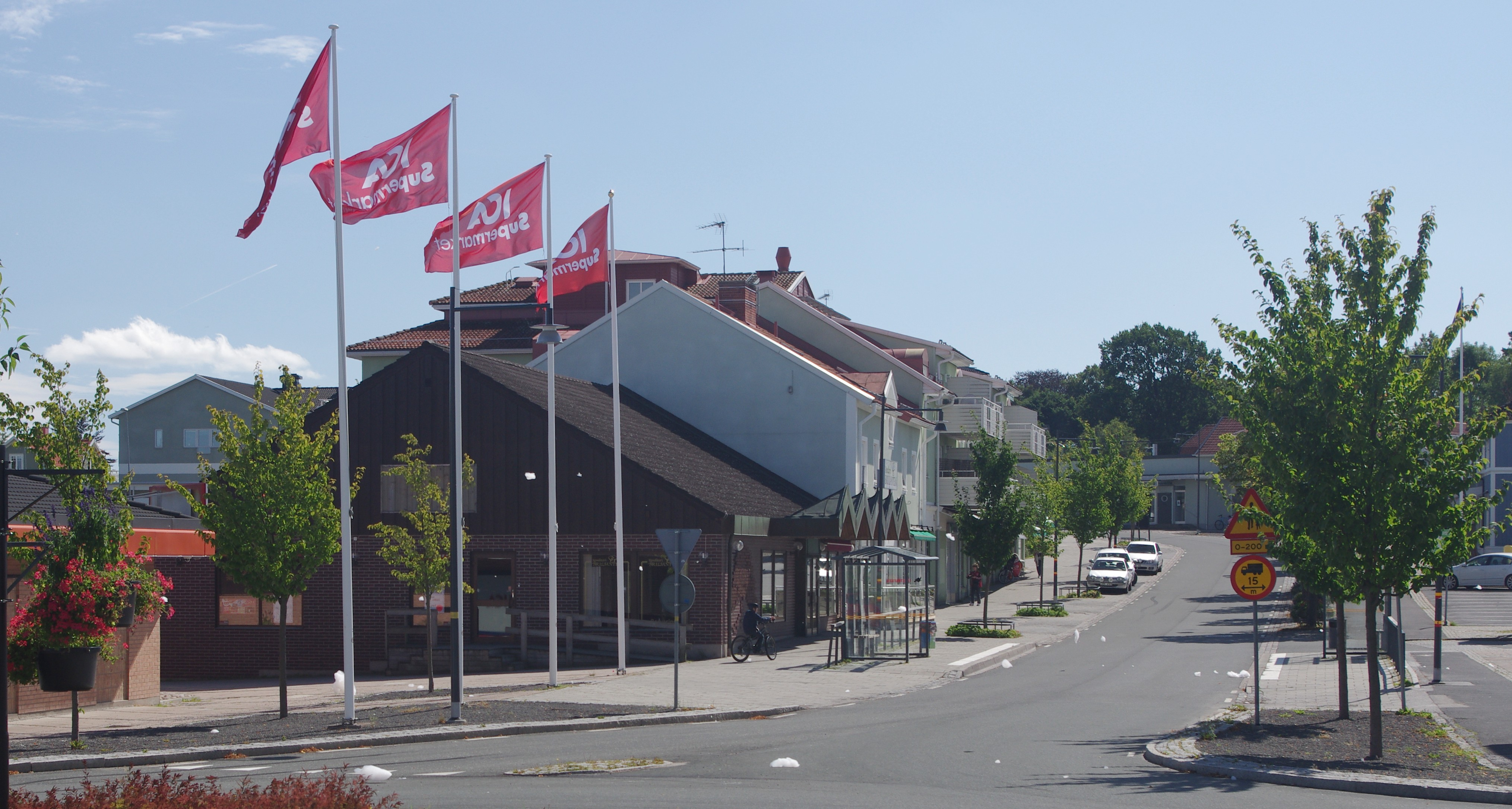
- Central Habo in August 2011

- Location within Jönköping Location within Sweden
- Coordinates: 57°55′N 14°04′E
- Country: Sweden
- Province: Västergötland
- County: Jönköping County
- Municipality: Habo Municipality

Area
  - Total: 4.54 km^{2} (1.75 sq mi)

Population (2019)
  - Total: 12,216
  - Density: 2,552/km^{2} (6,610/sq mi)
- Time zone: UTC+1 (CET)
  - Summer (DST): UTC+2 (CEST)

Habo (Swedish pronunciation: [ˈhɑ̌ːbʊ]) is a locality and the seat of Habo Municipality, Jönköping County, Sweden with 12,216 inhabitants in 2019. Habo Church is located circa 4 kilometres to the southwest.
