= Premier League of Volleyball of Bosnia and Herzegovina =

- Sport: Volleyball
- Founded: 2000
- No. of teams: 10
- Country: Bosnia and Herzegovina
- Confederation: CEV
- Continent: Europe
- Most recent champion: Radnik Bijeljina
- Most titles: Kakanj (12)
- Level on pyramid: 1
- Related competitions: CEV Champions League; CEV Cup; CEV Challenge Cup
- Website: osbih.ba

The Premier League of Volleyball of Bosnia and Herzegovina is the top volleyball league in Bosnia and Herzegovina.

== Premier volleyball league for men ==
=== 2020–21 Season participants ===
The following 10 clubs compete in the Volleyball Premier League during the 2020–21 season.

Locations of the 2020–21 Volleyball Premier League of Bosnia and Herzegovina teams

Team	City
Borac	Banja Luka
Bosna	Sarajevo
Domaljevac	Domaljevac
Jedinstvo	Brčko
Kakanj	Kakanj
Maglić	Foča
Mladost	Brčko
Modriča	Modriča
Bosna	Kalesija
Ljubinje	Ljubinje

=== Champions ===
- 2025 – Napredak
- 2024 – Radnik Bijeljina
- 2023 – Radnik Bijeljina
- 2022 – Kakanj
- 2021 – Mladost
- 2019 – Mladost
- 2018 – Mladost
- 2017 – Mladost
- 2016 – Mladost
- 2015 – Mladost (2nd Gacko, 3rd Kakanj )
- 2014 – Mladost (2nd Jedinstvo, 3rd Modriča Optima)
- 2013 – Kakanj (2nd Jedinstvo, 3rd Mladost)
- 2012 – Kakanj (2nd Mladost, 3rd Jedinstvo)
- 2011 – Kakanj (2nd Jedinstvo, 3rd Modriča Optima)
- 2010 – Kakanj (2nd Napredak, 3rd Radnik Bijeljina)
- 2009 – Kakanj (2nd Napredak, 3rd Bosna Sarajevo)
- 2008 – Kakanj (2nd Modriča Optima, 3rd Napredak)
- 2007 – Napredak
- 2006 – Kakanj
- 2005 – Kakanj
- 2004 – Kakanj
- 2003 – Kakanj
- 2002 – Napredak
- 2001 – Kakanj
- 2000 – Kakanj
- 1999 – Jedinstvo
- 1998 – Sinpos
- 1997 – Sinpos
- 1996 – Bihać
- 1995 – Bihać
- 1994 – Gradina

=== Cup winners ===
- 2022 – Mladost
- 2021 – Mladost
- 2020 – Not played
- 2019 – Mladost
- 2018 – Mladost
- 2017 – Mladost
- 2016 – Mladost
- 2015 – Mladost
- 2014 – Mladost
- 2013 – Jedinstvo
- 2012 – Kakanj
- 2011 – Kakanj
- 2010 – Kakanj
- 2009 – Kakanj
- 2008 – Kakanj
- 2007 – Modriča-Optima
- 2006 – Kakanj
- 2005 – Bosna Sarajevo
- 2004 – Kakanj
- 2003 – Kakanj
- 2002 – Kakanj
- 2001 – Kakanj
- 2000 – Jedinstvo
- 1999 – Sinpos
- 1998 – Sinpos
- 1997 – Kakanj
- 1996 – Kakanj
- 1995 – Kakanj
- 1994 – Kakanj

== Premier volleyball league for women ==
=== 2020–21 Season participants ===
The following 10 clubs compete in the Volleyball Premier League during the 2020–21 season.

Team	City
Banja Luka Volej	Banja Luka
Bimal-Jedinstvo	Brčko
Gacko	Gacko
Goražde	Goražde
Kula	Gradačac
Jahorina	Pale
Mostar	Mostar
Sloboda	Tuzla
Smeč	Lukavac
Igman	Ilidža

=== Champions ===
- 2022 Bimal-Jedinstvo
- 2021
- 2020
- 2019 Bimal-Jedinstvo
- 2018 Bimal-Jedinstvo
- 2017 Bimal-Jedinstvo
- 2016 Bimal-Jedinstvo
- 2015 Bimal-Jedinstvo
- 2014 Bimal-Jedinstvo
- 2013 Jedinstvo
- 2012 Jedinstvo
- 2011 Jedinstvo
- 2010 Jedinstvo
- 2009 Jedinstvo
- 2008 Jedinstvo
- 2007 Jedinstvo-Mobis
- 2006 Jelovica

=== Cup winners ===
- 2019 Bimal-Jedinstvo
- 2018 Bimal-Jedinstvo
- 2017 Bimal-Jedinstvo
- 2016 Bimal-Jedinstvo
- 2015 Bimal-Jedinstvo
- 2014 Gacko
- 2013 Jedinstvo
- 2012 Kula
- 2011 Jedinstvo
- 2010 Jedinstvo
- 2009 Jedinstvo
- 2008 Jedinstvo
- 2007 Jedinstvo-Mobis
- 2006 Jelovica
