= Allt för Sverige =

Swedish television program

- Created by: David Berner, Eric R. Williams (The Oxymorons)
- Presented by: Anders Lundin
- Country of origin: Norway
- Original languages: Swedish; English
- No. of seasons: 13
- No. of episodes: 105

Production
- Producer: Christer Åkerlund
- Production location: Sverige
- Camera setup: Ola Fredholm
- Running time: 60 minutes
- Production company: Meter Television

Original release
- Network: SVT1
- Release: 30 October 2011 – present

Allt för Sverige (literally Everything for Sweden, marketed in the United States as The Great Swedish Adventure) is a Swedish Emmy Award-winning reality show based on the original Norwegian format The Great Norway Adventure, also called Alt for Norge. The first season of Allt för Sverige was shown on Sveriges Television SVT1 from 30 October 2011 to 18 December 2011. The series is about Swedish Americans who return to their Swedish roots. The program provides the participants more information about their ancestral families by visiting some locations their ancestors lived. The cast members learn about the country's culture, customs, food, and quirks. As the episodes in the season progress, cast members leave the show after losing challenges and therefore find out less about their ancestry. Each season's winner gets a family reunion with their current relatives who stayed behind in Sweden.

The host of the program is Anders Lundin.

== Awards and Recognitions ==
Year	Award	Category	Result
2012	Kristallen	Reality 2011 (Season 1 - 2011)	Nominated
2016	44th International Emmy Awards	Non-Scripted Entertainment	Won
2017	Kristallen	Reality 2016 (Season 6 - 2016)	Won
2018	Kristallen	Reality 2017 (Season 7 - 2017)	Nominated
2019	Kristallen	Reality 2018 (Season 8 - 2018)	Nominated
2020	Kristallen	Reality 2019 (Season 9 - 2019)	Nominated
2022	Kristallen	Reality 2022 (Season 10 - 2021)	Won

== Season 1 (2011) ==
=== Contestants ===
- Janis Babcock, 40, Minnesota
- Eric Chellen, 50, Minneapolis, Minnesota
- Guy Clark, 50, Middletown, New York
- Shastin Corona, 35, St. Augustine, Florida
- Brian Gerard, 39, Louisville, Kentucky
- Jennifer Grannis, 40, Ponte Vedra, Florida
- Kirstin Highfield, 28, Colorado Springs, Colorado
- Greg Magnuson, 37, Los Angeles, California
- Jessica Pleyel, 22, Grand Rapids, Michigan
- Brett Ratell, 46, Bay City, Michigan

=== Episodes ===
Episode	Air date	Location(s)	Special Day	Eliminated
1	2011	Torekov / Skåne; Mellbystrand	Guy Clark (Hallands Väderö, Skåne)	No elimination
2	2011	Duvemåla		Jennifer Grannis
3	2011	Öland		Brett Ratell
4	2011	Stockholm		Janis Babcock
5	2011	Birka		Jessica Pleyel
6	2011	Jokkmokk		Greg Magnuson
7	2011	Järvsö		Eric Chellen
8	18 December 2011	Utö		Shastin Corona, Kirstin Highfield, Guy Clark

The winner of Allt för Sverige season 1 was Brian Gerard

In the eighth and final episode, filmed on the island of Utö and broadcast December 18, 2011, the Kentucky preacher Brian Gerard, New York City designer Guy Clark, Colorado student Kirstin Highfield and Florida police officer Shastin Corona participated in the final. Kirstin and Shastin ended up in 3rd and 4th place respectively, leaving Brian and Guy competing for 1st place. In the end, it was Brian who won by less than 10 seconds in the final. Brian got to meet the Swedish part of his family at the end of the last episode.

== Season 2 (2012) ==
Season two began airing on 28 October 2012 at 8:00 PM on SVT1.

=== Contestants ===
- Walter E. Beck, 51, Colorado Springs, Colorado
- Vernon Neil Ferguson, 42, Roanoke, Virginia
- Karen G. Peterson French, 55, Connecticut
- Thure Gustafsson, 48, Atlanta, Georgia
- Travis Scott McAfee, 32, Arkansas
- Anna Brita Östman Mohr, 32, Montana
- Meghan Reilly, 22, Chicago, Illinois
- Matthew Lidfors Robinson, 34, Chicago, Illinois
- Kelsey Stiles, 24, San Francisco, California
- Debra Sisneros Sutherland, 32, Minnesota

=== Episodes ===
Episode	Air date	Location(s)	Special Day	Eliminated
1	2012	Höga Kusten		* No elimination
2	2012	Skellefteå		Thure Gustafsson
3	2012	Stockholm		Karen G. Peterson French
4	2012	Mantorp, Gränna, Sölvesborg (Norje, Sweden Rock Festival) and Umeå		Meghan Reilly
5	2012	Häringe slott		Matthew Lidfors Robinson
6	2012	Södertälje		Debra Sisneros Sutherland
7	2012	Sunne		Vernon Neil Ferguson
8	2012	Trosa		Walter E. Beck, Kelsey Stiles, Travis Scott McAfee

The winner of Allt för Sverige season 2 was Anna Brita Östman Mohr, who met her relatives from the High Coast valley in central Sweden.

== Season 3 (2013) ==
The third season of Allt För Sverige was filmed during the month of June 2013, and was broadcast in Sweden during the autumn of 2013.

=== Contestants ===
- Dawn Anderson, Los Angeles
- Matthew Anderson, 39, Washington
- Eric Basir, 39, Illinois
- Dianne Bennett, 70, California
- Shane Booth, 36, North Carolina
- Laura McIntyre, 31, New York
- Lori Ferguson, 43, Florida
- Michael Peterson, 41, Texas
- Rebecca Redner, 40, Texas
- John Stenson, 47, Wisconsin

=== Episodes ===
Episode	Air date	Location(s)	Special Day	Eliminated
1	20 October 2013	Stockholm, Sigtuna	Rebecca Redner (Stockholm), Laura McIntyre	No elimination
2	27 October 2013	Söderköping	Shane Booth, Dianne Bennett	Laura McIntyre
3	3 November 2013	Göta kanal, Motala	Dawn Anderson (Motala), Eric Basir	Eric Basir
4	10 November 2013	Gothenburg	Michael Peterson (Vimmerby)	Dianne Bennett
5	17 November 2013	Värmland	John Stenson (Segerstad)	Michael Peterson
6	24 December 2013	Mora, Nusnäs	Matthew Anderson (Mora, Sweden)	Dawn Anderson
7	1 December 2013	Visby, Gotland / Tofta Beach	Lori Ferguson (Varberg)	Shane Booth
8	8 December 2013	Bungenäs Matsal Gotland / Blentarp		John Stenson, Rebecca Redner, Matthew Anderson

The winner of Allt för Sverige season 3 was Lori Ferguson, who met her relatives from Skåne at Östarps Gästgivaregård in Blentarp in southern Sweden.

== Season 4 (2014) ==
Season four was filmed over summer 2014.

=== Contestants ===
- Nathaniel "Nate" Butler, 48; musician; Fresno, California
- George Strid, 60; composer; Olympia, Washington
- Troy Bankord, 49; landscape architect; Palm Springs, California
- Nicholas "Nick" Jones, 35; barber; Valley Village, California
- Jennette Landes, 37; hair stylist; Georgetown, Colorado
- Leslie Longoria, 49; shop assistant; Waelder, Texas
- Katie Malik, 34; accountant / singer / yoga instructor; Gig Harbor, Washington
- John Olson, 30; waiter / writer / actor; Indianapolis, Indiana
- Courtney Schlagel, 25 years; Dallas, Texas
- Amanda Vinicky, aged 32; political reporter; Springfield, Illinois

=== Episodes ===
Episode	Air date	Location(s)	Special Day	Eliminated
1	2014	Malmö	Katie Malik, Leslie Longoria	No elimination
2	2014	Pjätteryd	Troy Bankord, Amanda Vinicky	Amanda Vinicky
3	2014	Gävle	George Strid, Courtney Schlagel	Leslie Longoria
4	2014	Uppsala	Jennette Landes	Troy Bankord
5	2014	Kiruna	Nick Jones	Nick Jones
6	2014	Nyköping	Nate Butler	Nate Butler
7	2014	Gällnö	John Olson	Jennette Landes
8	2014	Stockholm		Courtney Schlagel, George Strid, Katie Malik

The winner of season four was John Olson who met 120 relatives in Trollhättan, Västergötland. Katie Malik, George Strid and Courtney Schlagel came in 2nd, 3rd and 4th places, respectively.

== Christmas Special 2014 ==
In the Christmas special four Americans from previous seasons visit the town of Gällivare in northern Sweden in winter, but without having to compete for a single prize. Guy Clark (Season 1), Rebecca Redner (Season 3), Katie Malik (Season 4), and Nick Jones (Season 4) are able to meet with Swedish relatives as well as sample Swedish Christmas traditions. Anders Lundin hosts.

== Season 5 (2015) ==
Season five casting calls opened in December 2014. It was filmed in Sweden over the summer of 2015.

=== Contestants ===
- Nathan Arling, 36; drummer; Chicago, Illinois
- Karen Berg-Roylance, 46; writer/editor and housewife; Fruit Heights, Utah
- Alexis Bunten, 37; researcher; Monterey, California
- Kurt Engstrom, 45; sales; Tustin, California
- Brooke Langton, 44; actor; Los Angeles, California
- Jamie Lystra, 30; Executive Assistant; West Olive, Michigan
- James Morgan, 42; medical student; Andersonville, Chicago, Illinois
- Beverly Wassberg, 65; retired; Plano, Texas
- Charles Wassberg, 66; retired; Plano, Texas
- John Winscher, 33; actor and motion capture artist; Atlanta, Georgia
- Jenna Wroblewski, 20; student; Madison, Wisconsin

=== Episodes ===
Episode	Air date	Location(s)	Special Day	Eliminated
1	1 November 2015	Gräsmark	Karen Berg-Roylance, Charles Wassberg	No elimination
2	8 November 2015	Linköping	James Morgan, Brooke Langton	James Morgan
3	15 November 2015	Åland	Kurt Engstrom, Nathan Arling	Brooke Langton
4	22 November 2015	Vaxholm	Jamie Lystra	Jenna Wroblewski
5	29 November 2015	Strängnäs	Beverly Wassberg	Nathan Arling
6	6 December 2015	Stockholm	Alexis Bunten	Kurt Engstrom
7	13 December 2015	Tjörn	John Winscher	Alexis Bunten
8	20 December 2015	Örebro		Karen Berg-Roylance, Beverly Wassberg, Charles Wassberg, Jamie Lystra

The winner of season five was John Winscher, who met his relatives on the island of Tjörn, Västra Götaland. Jamie Lystra, Beverly and Charles Wassberg, and Karen Berg-Roylance came in 2nd, 3rd, and 4th places, respectively.

== Season 6 (2016) ==
Season six casting calls opened in December 2015. It was filmed in Sweden in May and June 2016.

=== Contestants ===
- Erica Anderson, 65; professor of psychology; San Francisco, California
- Jason Blohm, 49; insurance; Los Angeles, California
- John Burt, 45; lawyer; Herriman, Utah
- Micka Cain, 34; writer; Cincinnati, Ohio
- Patrick Glass, 30; chef; Spokane, Washington
- Anna LoPinto, 25; cowgirl; Nashville, Tennessee
- Inger Romero, 44; housewife and homeschooler; Temecula, California
- Erik "Swede" Seaholm, 38; special education teacher; Austin, Texas
- Sarah Steinman, 30; wilderness guide; Minneapolis, Minnesota
- Steven Swanson, 35; MMA fighter; Palm Springs, California

=== Episodes ===
Episode	Air date	Location(s)	Special Day	Eliminated
1	23 October 2016	Gothenburg / Dalsland	Erica Andersson, Steven Swanson	No elimination
2	30 October 2016	Falköping region	John Burt, Sarah Steinman	John Burt
3	6 November 2016	Sollentuna / Gothenburg	Micka Cain, Inger Romero	Inger Romero
4	13 November 2016	Ystad / Österlen	Jason Blohm	Erica Andersson
5	20 November 2016	Copenhagen, Denmark	Erik "Swede" Seaholm	Jason Blohm
6	27 November 2016	Birka	Patrick Glass	Erik "Swede" Seaholm
7	4 December 2016	Norrland	Anna LoPinto	Anna LoPinto
8	11 December 2016	Vira bruk		Steven Swanson, Patrick Glass, Micka Cain

The winner of season six was Sarah Steinman, who met her relatives near Skara, Västra Götaland. Micka Cain, Patrick Glass, and Steven Swanson came in 2nd, 3rd, and 4th places, respectively.

== Season 7 (2017) ==
Season seven casting calls opened in December 2016. It was filmed in Sweden in May and June 2017. The seventh season of Allt för Sverige premiered on October 22, 2017 and was broadcast on SVT1.

=== Contestants ===
- Victoria "Tori" Allen, 28; waitress; Denver, Colorado; origin Dalarna
- Kurt Carlson, 60; glass blower; Naples, New York; origin Värmland
- Alexander Kronholm (now known as Tej Mohan Singh Khalsa), 27; yoga instructor; Boston, Massachusetts; origin Skåne
- Kristin Lancione, 32; traveler Los Angeles, California; origin Västernorrland
- Amanda Orozco, 29; political science graduate; Portland, Oregon; origin Värmland
- Ann Oswald, 65; retired dental hygienist; Hickory, North Carolina; origin Dalarna
- Dylan Ratell, 26; musical performer; New York and Michigan; origin Södermanland
- Cosondra Sjostrom; 34, entrepreneur/curator; LA / Astoria, Oregon; origin Ångermanland
- Jack Waters, 34; editor/writer; Salt Lake City, Utah; origin Västergötland
- Nathan Younggren; 25, farmer; Hallock, Minnesota; origin Småland

=== Episodes ===
Episode	Air date	Location(s)	Special Day	Eliminated
1	22 October 2017	Avesta / Arvika	Tori Allen (Grytnäs, Dalarna), Ann Oswald (Vika, Dalarna)	No elimination
2	29 October 2017	Nora / Pershyttan	Tej Mohan (Vedby, Skåne), Amanda Orozco (Karlskoga, Värmland)	Tej Mohan
3	5 November 2017	Stockholm / Skansen	Jack Waters (Vänersborg, Västergötland), Kurt Carlson (Grums, Värmland)	No elimination/Kristin wins immunity
4	12 November 2017	Sundsvall	Kristin Lancione (Sundsvall, Västernorrland)	Dylan Ratell, Jack Waters in double elimination
5	19 November 2017	Härnösand	Cosondra Sjostrom (Resele, Ångermanland)	Kristin switches immunity with Dylan Ratell and goes home, Kurt Carlson
6	26 November 2017	Tranemo / Torpa stenhus	Nathan Younggren (Asa, Småland)	Amanda Orozco
7	3 December 2017	Malmköping	Dylan Ratell (Näshulta, Södermanland)	Nathan Younggren
8	17 December 2017	Vadstena		Ann Oswald, Cosondra Sjostrom, Tori Allen

The winner of season seven was Dylan Ratell, who met his relatives near Näshulta, Södermanland. Tori Allen, Cosondra Sjostrom, and Ann Oswald came in 2nd, 3rd, and 4th places, respectively.

== Season 8 (2018) ==
Season eight casting calls opened in December 2017. It was filmed in Sweden in May and June 2018. The eighth season of Allt för Sverige premiered on September 16, 2018 and was broadcast on SVT1 and SVT Play.

=== Contestants ===
- Kevin Chown, 48; Rock Musician; Escanaba, Michigan
- Tanya Edgil, 39; Housewife Student; Hamilton, Alabama
- Domonique Jackson-Russell, 34; Lawyer; Seattle, Washington
- Kyle Johnson, 29; Teacher; Independence, Minnesota
- Louis Larson, 52; Musician; Covington, Kentucky
- Andrew Morrisson; 27, Documentary Filmmaker; Scandia, Minnesota
- Ashley Mullinax, 32; Teacher; Clifton, Virginia
- David Neslund, 44; CAD Designer; Sutton, Alaska
- Susan Snyder, 58; Sales Representative; Roswell, New Mexico
- Christina Wight, 34; Specialist Teacher; Maryville, Tennessee

=== Episodes ===
Episode	Air date	Location(s)	Special Day	Eliminated
1	16 September 2018	Helsingborg / Viken	Ashley Mullinax (Näsum, Skåne), Domonique Jackson-Russell (Kolbäck, Västmanland)	No elimination
2	23 September 2018	Skövde / Olstorps Festplats, Tidan	Kyle Johnson (Grolanda Parish, Skaraborg, Västergötland), Andrew Morrisson (Synnerby Parish, Skaraborg, Västergötland)	Domonique Jackson-Russell
3	30 September 2018	Alfta / Edsbyn	Tanya Edgil (Biskopskulla, Uppland), Louis Larson (Öxabäck, Västergötland)	No elimination; Ashley Mullinax wins immunity
4	7 October 2018	Älvsbyn / Storforsen	David Neslund (Luleå, Norrbotten), Susie Snyder (un-aired on TV) (Vaxholm, Uppland)	Louis Larson and Susie Snyder in double elimination
5	14 October 2018	Vimmerby / Katthult Farm	Christina Wight (Bottnaryd, Småland)	Christina Wight
6	21 October 2018	Stockholm	Kevin Chown (Mellerud, Dalsland)	Tanya Edgil
7	28 October 2018	Landsort		Ashley Mullinax
8	4 November 2018	Norrköping		Andrew Morrison, Kevin Chown, David Neslund

The winner of season eight was Kyle Johnson.

== Season 9 (2019) ==
Season nine casting calls opened in December 2018. It was filmed in Sweden in May and June 2019. The ninth season of Allt för Sverige premiered on October 27, 2019 and was broadcast on SVT1 and SVT Play.

=== Contestants ===
- Jennifer Buhrow, 38; actress/clown; Chicago, Illinois; origin Värmland
- Janet "Holgie" Caplinger, 70; former dancer; Wyndham, Kansas (currently: Joshua Tree, California); origin Småland
- Kaytie Hubis, 30; restaurant manager; San Diego, California; origin Småland
- Robert Rambo, 59; war veteran; Cullowhee, North Carolina; origin Västergötland
- Roy "Dude" Settergren III, 41; Farmer; Wacissa, Florida; origin Östergötland
- Christina Sittser, 23; clothing designer; St. Louis, Missouri (currently: Los Angeles); origin Småland
- Christopher Tholstrom, 40; salesman; Denver, Colorado; origin Småland
- Mats Thureson, 22; carpenter; Burlington, Vermont; origin Scania
- Melissa Walls, 38; researcher; Duluth, Minnesota; origin Dalarna
- Brittany "Britt" Zikman, 28; project manager; Winnipeg, Canada; origin Jämtland

=== Episodes ===
Episode	Air date	Location(s)	Special Day	Eliminated
1	27 October 2019	Åhus	Mats Thureson (Åhus, Skåne), Christopher Tholstrom (Tolestorp, Slätthög, Småland)	No elimination
2	3 November 2019	Kalmar	Christina Sittser (Kalmar Castle, Kalmar, Småland), Janet "Holgie" Caplinger (Södra Hagby, Småland)	Janet "Holgie" Caplinger
3	10 November 2019	Oviken	Brittany "Britt" Zikman (Oviken, Jämtland)	No elimination; Christopher Tholstrom wins immunity
4	17 November 2019	Segerstad	Roy "Dude" Settergren III (Kronängen farm, Hällestad, Östergötland,	Brittany "Britt" Zikman and Melissa Walls in double elimination. But Christopher Tholstrom chose to give his immunity to Melissa Walls instead, so Christoper was eliminated.
5	24 November 2019	Stockholm	Jennifer Buhrow, Robert Rambo	Mats Thureson
6	1 December 2019	Alingsås	Kaytie Hubis	Roy "Dude" Settergren III
7	8 December 2019	Dalarna	Melissa Walls	Robert Rambo
8	15 December 2019	Skoklosters slott / Håbo		Christina Sittser, Kaytie Hubis, Melissa Walls

The winner of season nine was Jennifer Buhrow.

== Season 10 (2022) ==
The tenth season of Allt för Sverige premiered on January 16, 2022 and was broadcast on SVT1 and in SVT Play.

=== Contestants ===
- Nicole Archer, 30; video editor; Saratoga Springs, Utah; origin Gotland
- Sharon Fabriz, 63; teacher; Sacramento, California; origin Västergötland
- Sally Fransson, 37; author and yoga teacher; Minneapolis, Minnesota; origin Västergötland
- Brett Goss, 51; salesman; Chehalis, Washington; origin Västergötland
- Erika Newell, 37; zoo worker; Panama City, Florida; origin Uppsala
- Trevor Ohlsen, 25; singer-songwriter; Iron Mountain, Michigan; origin Småland
- Michael "Bubba" Palmer, 30; stage manager; Logan, Utah; origin Alingsås
- Brittany Pearson, 40; butcher; Vail, Colorado; origin Umeå
- Jon Strand, 38; former model; Indianapolis, Indiana; origin Värmland
- Melody Sky Weaver, 40; librarian; Seattle, Washington; origin Östergötland

=== Episodes ===
Episode	Air date	Location(s)	Special Day	Eliminated
1	16 January 2022	Bomstad, Karlstad	John Strand	No elimination
2	23 January 2022	Sävsjö	Michael "Bubba" Palmer	No elimination
3	30 January 2022	Gotland	Nicole Archer (Visby, Gotland); Melody Sky Weaver (Värna Herrsäter, Östergötland)	Melody Sky Weaver
4	6 February 2022	Stockholm	Sharon Fabriz; Trevor Ohlsen	Michael "Bubba" Palmer
5	13 February 2022	Umeå	Brett Goss; Brittany Pearson	Brittany Pearson
6	20 February 2022	Vindeln /	Sally Fransson	Brett Goss, Sharon Fabriz
7	Semi-Finals 27 February 2022	Stockholm /	Erika Newell	Sally Fransson won the mini prize, a smaller family get-together. However, winning this week's competition also meant she got sent home.
8	Finals 6 March 2022	Vaxholm	None	Nicole Archer, Trevor Ohlsen, John Strand

The winner of season ten was Erika Newell.

== Season 11 (2023) ==
The eleventh season of Allt för Sverige premiered on October 16, 2023 and was broadcast on SVT1 and in SVT Play.

=== Contestants ===
- Daniel Ray Hilsinger, Singer/Songwriter 36; Orinda, California; origin Dalarna
- Billie King, Financial Analyst, 42; Brownsburg, Indiana; origin Örebro
- Matthew Soderberg, 24; Wayne, Pennsylvania; origin Skåne
- Daniel Crow, 22; Edmond, Oklahoma; origin Gästrikland
- Michael Jackson, Real Estate, 46; Roswell, Georgia; origin Småland
- Desiree Davis, 57; Girard, Pennsylvania; origin Småland
- Mike Anderson, Advertising Executive, 70; Wilton, California; origin Östergötland
- Karl Ekwurtzel, Programmer/Athlete 33; Atlanta, Georgia; origin Småland
- Kirsten Holmberg, Healthcare, 32; Easthampton, Massachusetts; origin Halland
- Lillian Knutson, 50; Waxhaw, North Carolina; origin Lapland

=== Episodes ===
Episode	Air date	Location(s)	Special Day	Eliminated
1	16 October 2023	Ullared, Varberg	Lillian Knutson (Tärnaby, Lapland); Matthew Soderberg (Kaffatorp, Skåne)	No elimination
2	23 October 2023	Boxholm, Östergötland	Mike Anderson (Västerlösa, Linköping, Östergötland)	Lillian Knutson
3	30 October 2023	Stockholm; Vårruset	Karl Ekwurtzel (Mölnarp Tofteryd, Jönköping); Billie King (Hasselfors, Örebro)	Karl Ekwurtzel
4	6 November 2023	Malung, Dalarna	Desiree Davis (Eskilstorp, Hjalmaryd, Säby, Jönköping)	Mike Anderson
5	13 November 2023	Falun; Lugnet; Dalarna	Daniel Ray Hilsinger (Grängesberg, Dalarna); Kirsten Holmberg (Sällstorp, Halland)	Matthew Soderberg
6	20 November 2023	Skansen, Stockholm	Daniel Crow (Torsåker, Gävleborg, Gästrikland)	Desiree Davis
7	Semi-Finals 27 November 2023	Kiruna, Sápmi, Lapland	Michael Jackson (Adelöv, Nannarp, Jönköping)	Daniel Crow
8	Finals 4 December 2023	Kiruna, Jukkasjärvi, Lapland	None	Michael Jackson, Billie King, and Daniel Ray Hilsinger

The winner of season eleven was Kirsten Holmberg, who met her relatives near Svaneholm Castle, Skåne. Daniel Ray Hilsinger, Billie King, and Michael Jackson came in 2nd, 3rd, and 4th places, respectively.

== Season 12 (2024) ==
The twelfth season of Allt för Sverige premiered on November 2, 2024 and was broadcast on SVT1 and in SVT Play.

=== Contestants ===
- Craig Sundell, 69, Country Club Manager; Aubrey, Texas; origin Gotland
- Rebecca Olson, 37; Walnut Creek, California; origin Bohuslän
- Max Mirho, 27, Social Media; Chicago, Illinois; origin Småland
- Julie Evans, 33, Marketer; Alexander, Arkansas; origin Småland
- Case Erickson, 48, Motivational Coach; San Marcos, Texas; origin Skåne
- Tanya Anderson, 41; Jersey City, New Jersey; origin Hälsingland
- Melodie Pullen, 48; Marysville, Ohio; origin Skåne
- Bryan Withiam, 45, Attorney; Cushing, Oklahoma; origin Gotland
- Britta Lundin, 39, Screenwriter; Los Angeles, California; origin Gästrikland
- Tim Sakahara, 48, Communications Director; Honolulu, Hawaii; origin Gästrikland

=== Episodes ===
Episode	Air date	Location(s)	Special Day	Eliminated
1	2 November 2024	Gothenburg; Lysekil	Rebecca Olson (Bullarebygden, Bohuslän)	No elimination
2	9 November 2024	Öland, Sandby borg	Julie Evans (Bröttjestads Hönsgård, Bredaryd, Småland)	Rebecca Olson
3	16 November 2024	Långasjö; Hultsfred	Max Mirho (Lönneberga, Småland); Case Erickson (Bromölla, Skåne)	Case Erickson
4	23 November 2024	Stortorget & Fjäderholmarna & Norrmalmstorg, Stockholm	Craig Sundell (Havdhem, Gotland); Britta Lundin (Gävle, Gästrikland)	Britta Lundin
5	30 November 2024	Höga Kusten, Ångermanland; Heby, Uppland	Melodie Pullen (Malmö, Skåne)	Craig Sundell
6	7 December 2024	Filipstad & John Ericsson's Mausoleum, Värmland; Örebro, Närke	Tanya Anderson (Bollnäs, Hälsingland); Bryan Withiam (Lummelunda, Gotland)	Competition cliffhanger, no elimination shown
7	Semi-Finals 14 December 2024	Stockholm	Tim Sakahara (Högbo, Gästrikland)	Bryan Withiam (from cliffhanger in episode 6); Tanya Anderson
8	Finals 21 December 2024	Birka	None	Tim Sakahara; Max Mirho; Melodie Pullen

The winner of season twelve was Julie Evans.

== Season 13 (2025) ==
The thirteenth season of Allt för Sverige premiered on October 20, 2025 and was broadcast on SVT1 and in SVT Play.

=== Contestants ===
- Mickelle Bergman, 35; Inver Grove Heights, Minnesota; origin Dalarna
- Andrew Björklund, 38; Los Angeles, California; origin Värmland
- Maybeth Soderberg Bouchard, 73; Princeton, Illinois; origin Gotland and Skåne
- Elizabeth Bundrick, 26; Clemson, South Carolina; origin Småland
- Jacob Eriksson, 29; Brooklyn, New York; origin Stockholm
- Shérie Helland, 40; New Richmond, Wisconsin; origin Halland
- Robert Johanson, 67; St. John, U.S. Virgin Islands; origin Kalmar
- Joel Johnson, 38; Minneapolis, Minnesota; origin Torsby
- Michaelina Magnusson Martin, 47; Kalamazoo, Michigan; origin Västergötland
- Trent Rydberg, 46; Overland Park, Kansas; origin Jönköping

=== Episodes ===
Episode	Air date	Location(s)	Special Day	Eliminated
1	20 October 2025	Torekov; Hovs Hallar; Grevie; Båstad	Maybeth Soderberg Bouchard (Glimåkra, Skåne)	No elimination
2	27 October 2025	Göta Canal; Forsvik; Karlsborg; Tiveden; Totebo	Trent Rydberg (Brandstorp, Jönköping); Elizabeth Bundrick (Totebo, Småland)	Maybeth Soderberg Bouchard
3	3 November 2025	Omberg; Alvastra Abbey; Linköping	Michaelina Magnusson Martin (Sätila, Västergötland); Mickelle Bergman (Venjan, Dalarna)	Trent Rydberg lost the challenge, but Mickelle Bergman chose to drop out to be home with her young daughter.
4	10 November 2025	Stockholm	Jacob Eriksson (Stockholm)	Elizabeth Bundrick
5	17 November 2025	Avesta; Säter; Stora Skedvi; Säterdalen	Andrew Björklund (Ölme, Värmland)	Michaelina Magnusson Martin
6	24 November 2025	Skinnskatteborg; Karmansbo Bruk	Robert Johanson (Västervik, Kalmar)	Robert Johanson
7	Semi-Finals 1 December 2025	Uppsala	Joel Johnson (Lekvattnet, Torsby); Shérie Helland (Steninge, Halland))	Joel Johnson
8	Finals 8 December 2025	Vik Castle	None	Shérie Helland; Jacob Eriksson; Andrew Björklund

The winner of season thirteen was Trent Rydberg, who met his relatives at Årås Säteri in Västergotland. Andrew Björklund, Jacob Eriksson, and Shérie Helland came in 2nd, 3rd, and 4th places, respectively.

== US casting ==
Casting each year is announced through The Great Swedish Adventure.
