= Erica Anderson (psychologist) =

Clinical psychologist

- Born: Edina, Minnesota
- Occupation: Psychologist
- Known for: First transgender president of the United States Professional Association of Transgender Health

Erica Anderson is a clinical psychologist who specializes in treating transgender children. After coming out as a transgender woman in 2016 on the TV show Allt för Sverige (Everything for Sweden) she worked at a child gender clinic at the University of California San Francisco (UCSF) until 2021. She was the first transgender president of the United States Professional Association of Transgender Health and was on the board of the World Professional Association of Transgender Health between 2019 and her resignation in 2021.

She is controversial among the trans community and trans healthcare providers. She has given interviews, written op-eds, and testified in court that transgender children should require more assessment than they are given and may be transitioning "because it's trendy".

== Early life and education ==
Anderson was born to an advertising executive and schoolteacher turned housewife in 1951 and grew up in the town of Edina, Minnesota. She had two younger sisters. She was a boy scout and church youth leader. She imagined being a woman at 12 and was trying on her sisters clothes in secret at 14.

She realized she was trans in her early 20s during her psychology degree but stayed closeted. She married when she and her future wife were finishing graduate school and relocated to Minnesota, where she had a postdoc. The couple stayed together for the next 30 years and had two children together.

She received a master's degree in theology.

== Transition ==
At 45 years old, Anderson visited an endocrinologist who refused to prescribe her gender-affirming hormone treatment. Anderson's wife found a storage room full of women's clothes, confronted her, and told her she'd divorce if she transitioned. Anderson tried to stop and couldn't, describing it as a don't ask don't tell policy.

At 58 she began hormone treatment, received facial feminization surgery, legally changed her name, started a new job, and moved to California. She received bottom surgery at 61.

Anderson became the first openly transgender character on the TV show Allt för Sverige (Everything for Sweden) in 2016. For the role, she was nominated for two Gaygalan Awards including Trans Person of the Year.

== Career ==
Beginning in 2016, Anderson worked at the Child and Adolescent Gender Center at the University of California San Francisco (UCSF) Benioff Children’s Hospital. She was also a psychology professor at UCSF. In 2018, the Washington Post described Anderson as "sometimes playing devil's advocate" in the controversy over "whether gender dysphoria is permanent or ephemeral". Anderson told the Post she thought "a fair number of kids are getting into it because it's trendy" and that "I'm often the naysayer at our meetings. I'm not sure it's always really trans." Some of her youth patients have stopped seeing her or described sessions with her as feeling interrogated. She left in 2021 to focus on her private practice and since written multiple op-eds and given various interviews.

From 2019 to 2021 she was the first transgender president of the United States Professional Association of Transgender Health (USPATH) and was on the board of the World Professional Association of Transgender Health (WPATH).

In October 2021, Anderson went public with concerns about the rigor of pediatric gender care and the potential impact of puberty blockers on later sexual function. She was interviewed by Abigail Shrier, an author who activists consider anti-trans, in an article on Bari Weiss's substack titled "Top Trans Doctors Blow the Whistle on ‘Sloppy’ Care". Anderson said that there has been "sloppy healthcare work" in this field and that she expected regret rates of transition to increase because of a lack of sufficient mental-health evaluations. Her colleagues, including USPATH president and UCSF professor Madeline Deutsch, said "we were all broadsided". A week later, USPATH and WPATH issued a statement opposing "the use of the lay press" for scientific debate about transgender healthcare. Anderson disagreed with the directive.

In November, she wrote an op-ed in the Washington Post with Laura Edwards-Leeper arguing they were "disgusted" by state bans on gender-affirming care for minors but were worried providers were dispensing medicine too hastily and skipping assessments. In lieu of what they argued was premature transitioning, they promoted "gender exploratory therapy", a method of conversion therapy.

Anderson attracted increased criticism from peers for her positions. In November, the USPATH board privately censured Anderson. In December, the board imposed a 30-day moratorium on speaking to the press for all board members and Anderson resigned from her position as USPATH president and WPATH board member in protest. She had not previously raised her concerns at board meetings before speaking to the media. She told the LA Times the USPATH board was "not equipped" to deal with the issues because fellow board member Johanna Olson-Kennedy, the only other youth specialist, had voiced skepticism of psychological assessments. She continues to be a member of WPATH and supports the updated SOC8 guidelines.

In November 2023, Anderson filed an amicus brief in a Maryland lawsuit in support of parents represented by the conservative law group Wisconsin Institute for Law and Liberty and the Alliance Defending Freedom. Her statement argued that social transition "is a major and potentially life-altering decision that requires parental involvement, for many reasons." The Southern Poverty Law Center said "the ADF sees more success with experts like Levine and Anderson because their involvement, relevant clinical expertise and claimed political positions allows the ADF to mask the extremism of the policies it is defending in court" and despite its infamy for anti-LGBTQ+ positions "self-proclaimed moderates and liberals like Erica Anderson, Stephen Levine and James Cantor can all claim that they’re not extremists by working with the ADF, and that their individual positions are moderate and science-informed."

In 2024, the Saskatchewan government implemented an educational policy which Anderson helped author requiring parental consent for students under the age of 16 to change their names or gender in school. The decision was challenged by local LGBT groups and Anderson submitted an affidavit in support of the government arguing that social transition can have significant psychological impact.

The same year, New Brunswick Premier Blaine Higgs began claiming that 60% of kids "are given automatic affirmation and put on some sort of hormone therapy" at their first appointment based on a 2021 study. Higgs declined to comment to the press and referred them to James Cantor and Anderson, who repeated the study's figure. The author of the study in question, Greta Bauer, stated this was a misrepresentation as the youth had to first receive a diagnosis of gender dysphoria and, on average, see 2.7 other professionals and wait 269 days from referral. She stated Anderson and Higgs had not cited the study responsibly and were "portraying a misleading picture of what's happening in medical care".

In 2024, she described the Society for Evidence-Based Gender Medicine as the most important group of clinicians and scientists in the field and said they do "not exist so much to oppose gender-affirming care as to determine the best approach to gender-questioning youth".
