= Siggebohyttan =

18th century manor in Lindesberg, Sweden

Coordinates: 59°36′51″N 15°2′23″E

Siggebohyttan is an 18th-century bergsmansgård (miner's manor) in Lindesberg Municipality, Örebro County, Sweden. It is among the best-preserved examples of traditional Bergslagen mining-family architecture in Sweden. Since 1929 it has operated as a seasonal museum managed by the Örebro County Museum. The property is protected as a listed building (byggnadsminne) under Swedish law and is designated a site of national interest for cultural heritage conservation.

== Location and description ==
The manor is located in the hamlet of Siggebohyttan, on the western shore of Lake Usken in the historic province of Västmanland. The main building is notable for its exterior loggia, which is one of the longest of its kind in Sweden. The building contains 14 rooms and 3 kitchens, and retains the red-painted timber, turf roof, and cast-iron chimneys characteristic of Bergslagen miners’ dwellings.

== Historical background ==
Siggebohyttan lies within a region identified as a centre of Swedish iron mining in early cartography, including the 1539 Carta marina of Olaus Magnus. Iron extraction in the Lindesberg area is documented from the medieval period. By the 18th century, Swedish bar iron accounted for a large share of British imports; between 1750 and 1759 it supplied 64% of Britain's demand, and between 1790 and 1799 about 40%.

The family associated with the manor engaged in multiple stages of iron production, including forestry, charcoal production, ore extraction, smelting, and wholesale trade. This “vertically integrated” model was typical of the bergsman caste, a hereditary class of independent mining entrepreneurs recognised by the Swedish Crown through the Board of Mines (Bergskollegium).

== Construction and ownership ==
The current manor was built around the turn of the 18th century for Anders Olsson, a wealthy bergsman nicknamed “Emperor Anders” in local accounts for his business acumen and physical stature. The official cultural-heritage register describes the building as unusually large for its type, noting that Olsson chose a traditional design “but on a large scale and with unique details” rather than adopting contemporary bourgeois styles.

Ownership remained within the extended family for over a century. In the late 19th century, Anders Andersson (1835–1914), born at Södra Siggebohyttan, expanded family holdings and invested in agriculture, forestry, and banking. Contemporary reports claimed he was worth over one million riksdaler; probate records show a net estate of about 200,000 riksdaler.

== Decline and preservation ==
The bergsman economic system was dismantled following the abolition of the Bergskollegium privileges in 1857, and smaller independent works declined with the rise of large-scale iron and steel plants. Following the death of the last heir, the property was sold to a mining company, then purchased in 1910 by the Örebro County Heritage Association. It was restored and opened to the public as a museum in 1929. It is now administered by the Örebro County Museum

== See also ==
- Pershyttan mining museum
