= Primeval (film) =

2007 American horror film by Michael Katleman

- Theatrical release poster
- Directed by: Michael Katleman
- Written by: John Brancato; Michael Ferris
- Produced by: Gavin Polone
- Starring: Dominic Purcell; Orlando Jones; Brooke Langton; Jürgen Prochnow
- Cinematography: Edward J. Pei
- Edited by: Gabriel Wrye
- Music by: John Frizzell
- Production company: Pariah Films
- Distributed by: Buena Vista Pictures Distribution (Note: Distributed through the Hollywood Pictures banner.)
- Release date: January 12, 2007; (United States)
- Running time: 94 minutes
- Country: United States
- Language: English
- Box office: $15.2 million

Primeval is a 2007 American action-adventure horror film directed by Michael Katleman and starring Dominic Purcell, Orlando Jones, and Brooke Langton. Inspired partially by the true story of Gustave, a 20 ft (6.1 m), 2,000 pounds (910 kg; 0.91 t) giant, man-eating Nile Crocodile in Burundi, the film centers on a team of American journalists who travel to Burundi to film and capture him.

The film was released on January 12, 2007, receiving negative reviews from critics but grossed $15 million worldwide. Despite its title, it has no relation to the 2007 ITV television series of the same name.

== Plot ==
In Burundi, a British forensic anthropologist is examining the corpses in a mass grave, claiming they were all killed in an identical manner. When the woman digs her shovel into a flat area of suspicious, isolated mud near the water, an unseen creature suddenly attacks and violently drags her into the river. The UN soldiers accompanying her fire their weapons into the water until they notice a part of her excruciatingly mutilated body float back to the surface, before being suddenly pulled underwater by a creature hidden underneath.

In a New York City newsroom, television journalist Tim Manfrey is assigned by his boss, Roger Sharpe, to travel to Burundi with Aviva Masters, a reporter who deals with animal stories, to investigate the legend of Gustave, a gigantic, fierce Nile crocodile known to have killed hundreds of people in Africa over the years. With the killing of the anthropologist, Gustave has become an interesting subject to the world. Despite knowing Burundi is a war zone, Tim reluctantly agrees to go because one of his stories is based on falsified evidence. Tim and Aviva are accompanied by Tim's cameraman, Steven Johnson, and herpetologist Matt Collins, intending to capture Gustave alive.

At the airport in Bujumbura, the team meets a government official named Harry, who delays their departure by warning them about the dangers and political unrest in the bush caused by a ruthless warlord nicknamed "Little Gustave". Tim brushes Harry aside by faking a call to Roger, and the team departs to search for the crocodile, accompanied by two soldier escorts. The team reaches the village where the last attack occurred and meets their guide and licensed hunter, Jacob. The local shaman blesses them and explains the legend of Gustave and humanity's dark nature, which breeds its own monsters. The team devises a plan to capture Gustave using a steel cage baited with a live goat. The friendly villagers assemble the cage and place it on a nearby riverbank. Gustave senses a human trap and elusively swims away into the dark river. Matt manages to shoot it with a GPS tracking dart to locate the crocodile in real time.

Steven films the shaman and his family being executed by men working for Little Gustave. That night, while Steven and the others debate about airing the footage of the execution, "Jojo", a teenage villager who helped set up the cage, sneaks in to use himself as human bait. The crocodile ambushes and unsuccessfully tries to devour Jojo, before disappearing into the water. Meanwhile, Aviva catches one of the soldier escorts stealing money from a tent. The escort knocks her down and attempts to assault her. Gustave kills the soldier, ransacks the camp, and slips away. Aviva escapes unharmed and catches up with the others. The other escort relays over his radio that the Americans videotaped the shaman's execution. Believing Jacob to be responsible, the soldier wounds him and is then killed by Jojo. While Jacob's wound is being treated, Gustave tracks down the group and attacks their stilt house. Jacob recalls how his wife, Ona, was killed by Gustave, and that he swore revenge by killing the beast. Jacob sacrifices himself to kill the crocodile with a grenade, but it fails to detonate. Gustave grabs Jacob in its jaws and savagely devours him.

The next morning, a helicopter arrives to airlift the survivors to safety. Two of Little Gustave's henchmen arrive in a truck and ambush the helicopter with a rocket launcher to prevent the group from escaping. The group evades the strike, except for Matt, who runs after the helicopter to stop it from leaving. Matt is rammed by the truck and shot to death. When the truck driver notices the rest of the group, Tim yells for them to split up to confuse their attackers. In the ensuing chase, both of Little Gustave's henchmen are killed.

Separated from the group, Steven stumbles upon Gustave in a swamp. The crocodile gives chase, and Steven briefly gets it stuck between two trees before it breaks free. Gustave pursues Steven across the savannah, as he struggles to escape. Aviva stays with the injured Jojo while Tim searches for Steven and recovers his dropped camera. While waiting for help, Tim tells Aviva he now understands the shaman's earlier words. Matt told the group that crocodiles frequently feed on carrion, and there is no limit to how large they can grow with enough sustenance. The floating bodies from the civil war gave Gustave a taste for human flesh, allowing him to reach a gargantuan size and become an unstoppable man-eater.

Harry arrives in a Range Rover, and Tim realizes he is actually Little Gustave when he discovers the shaman's necklace in his possession. Little Gustave demands the video evidence of the shaman's execution. Tim attempts to trick Harry by giving him the tracker linked to the dart on Gustave, saying it will track the "suitcase" containing the computer and the video. Harry forces Tim and Aviva to lead them to the computer. While Harry holds Aviva at gunpoint, Tim and one of Harry's men follow the tracking signal to Gustave's lair, where the crocodile resides. Tim discovers Steven's mutilated body and a combat knife among the scattered human remains, using it to stab the guard. At the same moment, Aviva splatters Harry with Matt's container of crocodile pheromones and runs to Jim. The sudden commotion awakens the sleeping Gustave. Investigating the intruders, it ignores Jim, Aviva, and Jojo and instead devours the scent-covered Harry.

Tim, Jojo, and Aviva climb into the Range Rover, causing Gustave to attack through the rear window. To repel the crocodile, Tim stabs it directly in the mouth with a machete. Gustave retreats in pain and roars in defeat as the others drive away. Weeks later, Tim, Aviva, Jojo, and Wiley receive medical treatment and watch leftover footage of Steven on his camera from their flight back to America. The end credits state that the Burundian Civil War ended with a ceasefire in 2005. Gustave is still alive and killing people in the Rusizi River of Burundi.

== Cast ==
- Dominic Purcell as Tim Manfrey
- Brooke Langton as Aviva Masters
- Orlando Jones as Steven Johnson
- Jurgen Prochnow as Jacob Krieg
- Gideon Emery as Matt Collins
- Gabriel Malema as Jojo
- Linda Mpondo as Gold Tooth
- Lehlohonolo Makoko as Beanpole
- Dumisani Mbebe as Hahutu 'Harry' Mkwesa / 'Little Gustave'
- Eddy 'Big Eddy' Bekombo as Ato
- Chris April as Captain
- Ernest Ndlovu as Shaman
- Erica Wessels as Dr. Cathy Andrews
- Vivian Moodley as Indian UN Officer
- Lika Berning as Rachel (as Lika van den Bergh)
- Andrew Whaley as Senator Richard Porter
- Patrick Lyster as Roger Sharpe
- Jaqui Pickering as Newscaster (as Jacqui Pickering)
- Kent Shocknek as Newscaster
- Mathias Tabotmbi as Villager
- Kgmotoso Motlosi as Shaman's Son
- Thandi Nugbani as Shaman's Wife
- Michael Mabizela as Labourer
- Thomas Kariuki as Fisherman
- Azeez Danmola as Fisherman
- Pamphile Nicaye as Burundi Drummer
- Emmanuel Nkeshiman as Burundi Drummer
- Pierre Calver Nsabimana as Burundi Drummer
- Henry Jeane as Burundi Drummer
- Walter Emanuel Jones as Voice

== Production ==
The idea for the film came about from then Walt Disney Pictures President Oren Aviv who read an article about the elusive man-eating Nile crocodile Gustave spurring Aviv's interest in making a movie about it. The project was assigned to producer Gavin Polone while the screenplay was written by John Brancato and Michael Ferris. In February 2006, it was reported that Dominic Purcell and Orlando Jones had joined Primeval with Michael Katleman set to make his directorial debut. Purcell had been wanting to do a studio film, but when his agent told him about Primeval Purcell was initially uninterested as he felt the description sounded too much like Anaconda, but Purcell changed his mind upon reading the script and was intrigued by the true story aspects of the script as well as themes touching upon the Rwandan genocide. Purcell filmed the movie during hiatus between the first and second seasons of Prison Break.

=== Effects ===
Initially the film was set to recreate the crocodile as a practical effect using an animatronic crocodile made for the production, however, once the crew brought the prop to Africa and placed it in the water, they felt it didn't look very convincing or scary and made the last minute decision to rely fully on CGI to create the crocodile.

=== Filming ===
While the movie is set in Burundi, the actual filming was done in South Africa in the cities of Cape Town and Durban. Katleman cited Jaws as a major influence on how he decided to shoot the film and even experimented with some shots from the crocodiles point-of-view he called "Gustave-vision" that were ultimately excised from the film as it never met his satisfaction. During shooting, Jones improvised many of his character's dialogue.

== Release ==
The film was released on January 12, 2007. Director Michael Katleman disagreed with Disney's decision to market the crocodile as if it were a serial killer and felt that the film would've played better with audiences if the marketing had leaned more in the direction of a monster movie.

=== Home media ===
The film was released by Buena Vista Home Entertainment (under the Hollywood Pictures Home Entertainment banner) on June 12, 2007 on DVD and Blu-ray.

== Reception ==
=== Box office ===
Primeval grossed $10,597,734 in the United States with an additional $4,693,543 in other territories for a total of $15,291,277 worldwide.

During its domestic theatrical run, Primeval was shown in theaters for 354 days, equivalent to 50 weeks. At its peak, the film was screened in 2,444 theaters during the weeks of January 12–18, 2007 and January 19–25, 2007. In its opening week, the film made $7,716,473 across 2,444 theaters, achieving a per-theater average of $3,157.

Internationally, the film grossed $867,343 in Mexico, where it reached its peak presence in 221 theaters and ran for 36 weeks. In Malaysia, it earned $825,250, with a peak presence in 5 theaters and a run time of 42 weeks. In Thailand, the film grossed $609,611, with a peak presence in 56 theaters and a run time of 38 weeks.

=== Critical reception ===
On review aggregator website Rotten Tomatoes, Primeval received an approval rating of 21% based on 57 reviews, and an average rating of 3.46/10. Its consensus reads, "Primeval is a low-quality horror film, which due to the inane political messages does not even qualify as campy fun." On Metacritic, which assigns a normalized rating to reviews, the film has a weighted average score of 35 out of 100, based on 11 critics, indicating "Generally unfavorable reviews". Audiences polled by CinemaScore gave the film an average grade of "D+" on an A+ to F scale.

Luke Y. Thompson of The Village Voice gave the film a negative review, writing, "With a little camp this could have been fun, but director Michael Katleman doesn't play it that way, and even Jürgen Prochnow's crazed Ahab wannabe is unfortunately understated." Peter Hartlaub from The San Francisco Chronicle stated that the film "almost works as an intentionally stupid action movie", but noted "for every guilty pleasure moment, a failed attempt to inject importance to the plot will shock you back into having a bad time again." A.O. Scott of The New York Times criticized the film's editing, script, and characters. Jon Condit from Dread Central awarded the film a score of 1/5, calling it "a really poor man's Blood Diamond that just happens to also feature an enormous man-eating crocodile". Condit panned the film's thin characterizations, misleading marketing, and called Purcell "a major miscasting problem". Andrew Smith from Popcorn Pictures rated the film a score of 2/10, writing "The film doesn't have a clue what it wants to be and switches frequently from generic monster-on-the-loose flick to the dramatic 'let's make a statement on Africa' thriller it clearly has designs on being. Neither works very well."

In his review for The Globe and Mail, Jason Anderson gave the film a low rating of 1.5/5. Describing the film as an "exploitation-movie variation on Blood Diamond," he criticized it for its misguided attempt to go beyond a simple killer-crocodile premise and highlights the film's problematic anthropomorphization of the crocodile as "the most prolific serial killer in history," noting that the filmmakers seem embarrassed by their endeavor. Anderson notes that he finds the film lacking in the fun and intensity of similar creature features and portrays it as "grim, dull, and ugly." The film also received criticism from Naturalist Patrice Faye, who stated that the film was "an insult to purists and herpetologists but, above all, an insult to Burundi. It shows the country in a bad light, and the people of Burundi are made out to be savages, barbarians, thieves, and murderers".

Dennis Harvey's review of the film for Variety applauded its creative blend of genres, describing it as a "55% giant-crocodile "Jaws" and 45% fact-inspired, "Blood Diamond"-esque civil-war-violence thriller." He states that despite its unconventional combination, the film is seen as decently handled genre fare with a handsome widescreen production and acknowledges that "it's not exactly good, but it's not bad, and far from boring." He highlights Katleman's direction as well as the film's high-quality visuals and well-mixed soundtrack.

== See also ==
- Gustave (crocodile)
- List of killer crocodile films
- Man-eater
