= Chilly Christmas =

- DVD cover
- Directed by: Gregory Poppen
- Written by: Gregory Poppen
- Produced by: Steven Paul
- Starring: C. Thomas Howell; Bryson Sams; Karan Brar; Cassidy Mack; Brooke Langton; Tom Arnold
- Cinematography: R. Michael Givens
- Edited by: Stephen Eckelberry
- Music by: John Coda
- Distributed by: Anchor Bay Entertainment; SP Distribution
- Release date: November 6, 2012
- Running time: 84 minutes
- Country: United States
- Language: English

Chilly Christmas is a 2012 direct-to-DVD family comedy film starring C. Thomas Howell, Karan Brar, Brooke Langton and Tom Arnold. In the United Kingdom the film was released under the title A Christmas Tail.

== Plot ==
Eleven year old Bobby lives in Sunshine Beach in California with his police detective father and his best friend, a dog called Chilly. His dad tells him that they are moving to New York City, where they will live in a small apartment. Chilly, being a large outdoor dog and completely unhouse-trained, must stay behind. Bobby, with help from his friends, is determined to achieve a Christmas miracle and train Chilly to live in a flat. When dog thieves come to steal Chilly, the dog remembers the house tricks Bobby taught him and uses them to avoid being caught. Bobby's dad and the police arrive to find the boy and dog safe and the thieves foiled. His Dad decides not to move away and after a second Christmas miracle, snow in California, Bobby and Chilly celebrate, knowing they can stay together.

== Cast ==
- C. Thomas Howell as Patrick Cole
- Bryson Sams as Bobby
- Karan Brar as Caps
- Cassidy Mack as Kizzy
- Brooke Langton as Lt. Mel Stone
- Casey Graf as Jasper Harris
- Tom Arnold as Quarterman
- Andy Pandini as Claussen
- Jonathan Kowalsky as Hale
