= Brandstorp Church =

Coordinates: 58.1016°N 14.1857°E

- Brandstorps kyrka
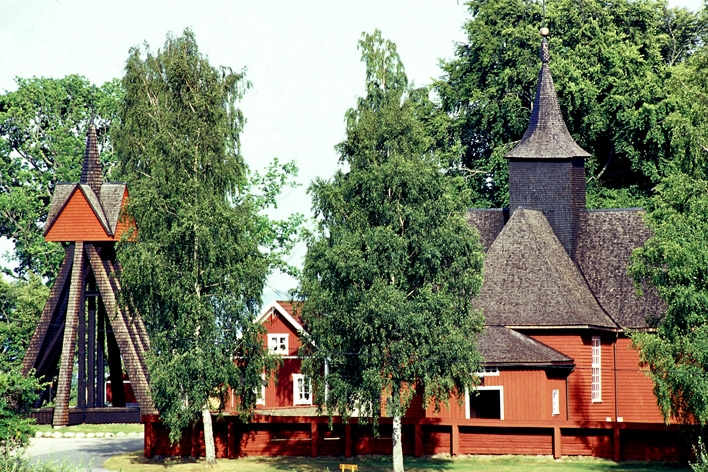
- Brandstorp Church
- Brandstorp Church
- Location: Brandstorp
- Country: Sweden
- Denomination: Church of Sweden

Administration
- Diocese: Skara
- Parish: Brandstorp

Brandstorp Church (Swedish: Brandstorps kyrka) is a wooden church building in Brandstorp in Sweden. Belonging to Brandstorp Parish of the Church of Sweden, it was built between 1694 and 1698.
