= The Replacements (film) =

2000 film by Howard Deutch

- Theatrical release poster
- Directed by: Howard Deutch
- Written by: Vince McKewin
- Produced by: Dylan Sellers
- Starring: Keanu Reeves; Gene Hackman; Orlando Jones; Jon Favreau; Brooke Langton; Rhys Ifans
- Cinematography: Tak Fujimoto
- Edited by: Seth Flaum; Bud S. Smith
- Music by: John Debney
- Production company: Bel Air Entertainment
- Distributed by: Warner Bros. Pictures
- Release date: August 11, 2000
- Running time: 118 minutes
- Countries: United Kingdom; United States
- Language: English
- Budget: $50 million
- Box office: $50.1 million

The Replacements is a 2000 sports comedy film directed by Howard Deutch and starring Keanu Reeves, Gene Hackman, Orlando Jones, Brooke Langton, Rhys Ifans, Jon Favreau, and Jack Warden in his last film appearance before his death in 2006.

The movie was loosely based on the 1987 NFL strike, specifically the Washington Redskins, who won all three replacement games without any of their regular players and went on to win Super Bowl XXII. Though the film is a story of the replacement players, the Falco–Martel quarterback controversy is quite similar to the one in the post-strike Washington controversy between Doug Williams and Jay Schroeder. Hackman narrated the episode of NFL Network's America's Game: The Super Bowl Champions devoted to that team.

== Plot ==
A professional football league is hit with a players' strike with four games left in the season. Washington Sentinels owner Edward O'Neil calls a former coach of his, Jimmy McGinty, telling him that the league's going to finish the regular season with replacement players and asks McGinty to coach the Sentinels the rest of the season, adding that winning three of the last four games will get them into the playoffs. McGinty accepts on the condition that he can sign the players he wants without O'Neil's interference.

McGinty pulls together players of varying talents who he believes can make an entertaining, if not winning, team. For quarterback, he chooses Shane Falco, a former All-American from Ohio State whose career went to pieces after a lopsided Sugar Bowl loss; he now lives on a houseboat in a Washington, D.C. marina and makes a living doing hull maintenance on private yachts. The striking players greet the replacement players with hostility, calling them "scabs" and throwing eggs at them; Falco gets his truck overturned. Head cheerleader Annabelle Farrell, who has to find new cheerleaders since the originals apparently walked out in sympathy with the players, hires strippers when the other tryouts go badly. After practice, she drives Falco home and surprises him with her vast football knowledge.

The replacements' first game is against Detroit, and the team struggles to get along. Falco tries to rally them, but on the last play, he falters when he sees a pending blitz and calls an audible, which falls short of the winning touchdown. At a local bar, the replacements are brooding over their loss when some of the striking players, led by their primadonna quarterback Eddie Martel, arrive and taunt them. Falco stands up to Martel, a brawl ensues, and the replacements are arrested. In jail they bond, dancing to the Gloria Gaynor song "I Will Survive" before McGinty bails them out. Farrell meets Falco the next day and tells him that he's the first quarterback she's seen in a long time who cares more for his teammates than himself, and a connection starts to grow between them.

The next day, in a chalk talk, when McGinty asks the players what their fears are, they realize they're all afraid of failing in their second chance at football. McGinty inspires the team to use their fear as a source of strength. In the Sentinels' next game, against San Diego, they fall behind but rally after a 65-yard field goal by their Welsh kicker, Nigel Gruff, winning the game 17–16. Falco meets Farrell at the bar she inherited from her father and now runs. After a conversation and a beer, they share a kiss.

The Sentinels nearly lose their next game on the road against Phoenix but win on a couple of improbable plays. When they return to DC, O'Neil tells McGinty that Martel has crossed the picket line, as has the entire Dallas team—the league's defending champion and the Sentinels' next opponent. O'Neil shows no confidence in Falco's ability to beat Dallas and hints to McGinty that he could be fired if he refuses to start Martel, reneging on the promise he'd given to McGinty to not interfere. McGinty gives in and tells Falco, saying that he has the "heart" Martel lacks. Too downcast to face Farrell, Falco stands her up for the date they had planned.

In the first half of the Dallas game, Martel clashes severely with the replacement players, blames them for his own mistakes, and ignores McGinty's play calls. The Sentinels trail Dallas 17–0 at halftime. On the way to the locker room, McGinty tells a TV reporter that what the team needs to come back and win is "miles and miles of heart". Seeing this on television, Falco returns to the stadium, and McGinty benches Martel. Falco finds Farrell and apologizes to her, giving her another kiss.

McGinty tells the replacements that the strike will end the next day, encouraging them to give everything they have left. The Sentinels rally to 17–14 with less than a minute left. Falco calls for a deep pass to the replacements' deaf tight end, Brian Murphy, and hits him with the game-winning touchdown pass as time expires, beating Dallas 20–17 and earning the Sentinels a playoff berth. McGinty narrates that the replacement players left the field with nothing but the satisfaction and personal glory of living the athlete's dream of a "second chance", as the replacements dance on the field to "I Will Survive".

== Cast ==
- Keanu Reeves as Shane Falco #16 (QB) — A left-handed former All-America quarterback for Ohio State who fell off the grid after choking in the 1996 Sugar Bowl and washing out of the pros after one season, giving him a derogatory nickname of "Footsteps", because of his impulse to scramble prematurely when he thinks a sack is coming.
- Gene Hackman as Coach Jimmy McGinty — Former head coach of the Washington Sentinels. Once fired by O'Neil, he is asked back to coach the replacement players. Seeing this as an opportunity to put together his personal fantasy football team, McGinty offers his recruits a chance at glory and truly believes in his players. He's old school in his belief that players should earn their keep, rather than expect things to be given to them.
- Brooke Langton as Annabelle Farrell — Head cheerleader for the Washington Sentinels and owner of a bar on 8th Street in Washington.
- Orlando Jones as Clifford Franklin #81 (WR) — A stockboy in a minimart who is fast but struggles catching the ball.
- Faizon Love as Jamal Abdul Jackson #72 (G) and Michael Taliferro as Andre Jackson #73 (G), the Jackson Brothers — Former offensive guards turned bodyguards for rapper ODB, who seem to excel only when they play on the same team. Both would have remained in the pros had they not fallen apart after one got traded.
- Rhys Ifans as Nigel Gruff #3 (K) — A Welsh soccer player and pub owner, nicknamed "The Leg" because he can kick a football the entire length of the playing field. He smokes on the field and has a gambling addiction.
- Jon Favreau as Daniel "Danny" Bateman #56 (MLB) — A reserved, almost reticent man during normal interaction with people, who goes completely berserk when placed in an adversarial situation. Linebacker and defensive captain. He was a walk on player at Michigan State and is a Gulf War veteran who received a Purple Heart. Member of the Washington D.C. Police SWAT team.
- Ace Yonamine as "Jumbo" Fumiko #68 (OT) — A Japanese sumo wrestler turned offensive tackle whose battle cry, "Nan desu ka" ("What is this") becomes the team's own.
- Troy Winbush as Walter Cochran #34 (RB) — An ordained minister who played one game in the pros and blew out his knee. He repeats this injury during his final game with the Sentinels after diving into the end zone for a touchdown.
- David Denman as Brian Murphy #86 (TE) — A tight end from Gallaudet University; according to McGinty, he would have been a first-round pick had he not been born deaf. He plays a major role in the team both on the field and off, scoring the game-winning touchdown and sparking the conversation that leads to a bar fight.
- Michael Jace as Earl Wilkinson / "Ray Smith" #42 (CB) — A former star cornerback and kick returner from Minnesota, serving a prison sentence for assaulting a police officer. He's allowed to play with the permission of the governor of Maryland under an alias.
- Gailard Sartain & Art LaFleur as Coach Pilachowski and Coach Banes, respectively — McGinty's coaching staff. Skeptical about the replacement players, they nevertheless follow McGinty's recommendations and find ways to work with them.
- Brett Cullen as Eddie Martel #7 — Regular starting quarterback for the Washington Sentinels, two-time Super Bowl winner.
- Archie L. Harris Jr. as Wilson Carr (DE) – Regular starting defensive end for the Washington Sentinels, and the "muscle" of Martel's clique of teammates. He joins Martel in crossing the picket line, and plays in the last game, with seemingly no more ill will towards the replacement players.
- Evan Parke as Malcolm LaMont (RB) – Regular starting running back for the Washington Sentinels, part of Martel's clique of teammates.
- John Madden and Pat Summerall portray themselves, offering play-by-play and color commentary on the games.
- Jack Warden as Edward O'Neil — Owner of the Washington Sentinels. O'Neil is the epitome of the double-talking, manipulative businessman interested only in accolades and doesn't think twice about reneging on a deal if it will earn him a more desirable result.
- Sarah Ann Morris as Heather - exotic dancer who attends Sentinels cheerleader tryouts during the strike.
- Caroline Keenan as Dawn — exotic dancer who attends Sentinels cheerleader tryouts during the strike.

== Production ==
Filming occurred in Baltimore, Maryland, making extensive use of PSINet Stadium (now known as M&T Bank Stadium). The stadium was known as Nextel Stadium in the movie. The Domino Sugar plant plant is visible in some scenes shot in the Inner Harbor.

== Reception ==
=== Box office ===
The film opened at the third position at the North American box office, making $11,039,214 in its opening weekend, behind Space Cowboys and Hollow Man, which was in its second consecutive week at the top spot. It eventually grossed $44.7 million domestically and $5.3 million internationally to over $50 million worldwide.

=== Critical response ===
On Rotten Tomatoes, the film has an approval rating of 41% based on 108 reviews, with an average rating of 4.96/10. The website's critical consensus reads: "The clichéd characters and obvious outcome make all the fun and excitement amount to nothing." On Metacritic, the film has a weighted average score of 30 out of 100 based on 32 critics, indicating "generally unfavorable reviews". Audiences polled by CinemaScore during its opening weekend gave the film an average grade of "A−" on an A+ to F scale.

Roger Ebert gave the film 2 out of 4 stars, writing that the film was "Slap happy entertainment painted in broad strokes, two coats thick."

== See also ==
- List of American football films
