= Saving Christmas (2017 film) =

- DVD cover
- Directed by: Tom DeNucci
- Written by: Tom DeNucci; Kevin DeCristofano
- Produced by: David Gere; Jason Hewitt
- Starring: Ed Asner; Patrick Muldoon; Brooke Langton
- Cinematography: Sam Eilertsen
- Edited by: Sam Eilertsen
- Music by: Brian Jackson Harris; Michael Wickstrom
- Production companies: Hollywood Media Bridge; Woodhaven Media; Alpha Hollywood Studios
- Distributed by: Lionsgate Films
- Release date: November 21, 2017
- Running time: 88 minutes
- Country: United States
- Language: English

Saving Christmas is a Christmas comedy-drama film about a middle school student who decides to prove that Santa Claus is real. Directed and co-written by Tom DeNucci, it stars Ed Asner, Brooke Langton, and Patrick Muldoon. It was released direct-to-video on November 21, 2017.

== Plot ==
Danny is a middle school student who lives in the town of Norpole, Maine with his mother Elizabeth and his sister Jennifer. Sadly, Danny's father has died, and this will be the family's first Christmas without him. When Jennifer says that she does not believe in Santa Claus any more, Danny decides to prove that Santa is real. With help from his sister, and his friends Matt and Jake, Danny begins his investigation. The young people interview local residents who may have knowledge of Santa's existence, and look for evidence using high-tech gadgets that they assemble themselves.

Meanwhile, Elizabeth, who is a professional hairdresser, is befriended by Sammy, who is new in town. Sammy has recently been hired as the marketing director of the Norpole Toy Company. Sammy tells Elizabeth that Rick, the head of the company, is really Santa Claus. He enlists her help for a hair and fashion makeover for Rick. He also arranges a cross-marketing tie-in for Rick to appear in person at a popular Christmas season event in town – the Gingerbread Brawl, a professional wrestling promotion.

== Cast ==
- Ed Asner as Rick, head of the Norpole Toy Company
- Brooke Langton as Elizabeth, Danny's mother
- Patrick Muldoon as Sammy, marketing director at the Norpole Toy Company
- Jack Brunault as Danny, a middle school student who decides to prove that Santa Claus is real
- Lindsey Blanchard as Jennifer, Danny's sister
- Max Harris as Matt, Danny's friend
- Jalon Christian as Jake, Danny's friend
- Chase Andersen as Roger, a bully at school
- Fred Sullivan as Big John Pelser, a professional wrestling promoter
- Mike Bennett as Max Miracle
- David Heath as Tucker Von Magnus
- Tommy Dreamer as himself
- Matt Striker as himself
- Maria Kanellis as herself
- David Gere as DG Haven

== Production ==
Saving Christmas was filmed on location in Cranston, Rhode Island.

The working title for the movie was The Santa Files.

== Critical response ==
Common Sense Media gave Saving Christmas one star out of five. Their reviewer wrote, "If one can get past the inept direction, script, performances, and even music placement, there's still a routine, generic, poorly conceived story left to let audiences down.... It's sad to see Edward Asner, a fine actor, simply going through the motions in this production. And what can one possibly say about the silly wrestling match that looks as though it was shot in a three-car garage? Saving Christmas (2017) has little to recommend it."

She Scribes said, "This is a straight-to-DVD type of movie, and for good reason. It's very slow and rather corny. That doesn't mean it's a bad movie, it just means that it would never have made it in theaters.... Younger family members might find more enjoyment with this film, especially when it comes to the high tech gadgets the kids use, pro (?) wrestling and friendship."

Game Vortex said, "As in a lot of these kid-focused films, the acting is really overdone, from the adults on down to the children.... And, of course, you can't get more over the top than wrestling, so there you have it. Don't expect any Oscar-winning material here, but the movie is okay. If you can pick it up for a bargain, younger kids will probably enjoy the caper aspect to it."

== See also ==
- List of Christmas films
- Santa Claus in film
