= Brooke Langton =

American actress

- Occupation: Actress
- Years active: 1992–present
- Children: 1

Brooke Langton is an American actress. She starred as Samantha Reilly in the Fox prime time soap opera Melrose Place (1996–1998) and as Angela Bennett in the USA Network thriller series The Net (1998–1999).

== Career ==
Langton's love of improvisational theatre started at Second City in Chicago. Studying acting with Larry Moss and Ivana Chubbuck, Langton pursued independent films. Her first films were Swingers, directed by Doug Liman, and then Reach the Rock, produced by John Hughes (cult movie director of Sixteen Candles and many other iconic hits).

Langton was a regular cast member in the ABC adventure drama series, Extreme, co-starring opposite Julie Bowen and James Brolin.

In 1996, Langton joined the cast of the Fox prime time series Melrose Place, playing Samantha Reilly Campbell. She starred in the show during its fifth and sixth season, leaving early in the seventh season. After leaving Melrose Place, Langton was cast as lead in the USA Network series, The Net, a television drama based on the 1995 film of the same name. Langton portrayed the character Angela Bennett, who was played by Sandra Bullock in the film. The series was canceled after one season. She later starred alongside Keanu Reeves and Gene Hackman in the 2000 film The Replacements, her biggest feature credit to date. Langton also co-starred in the comedy films Playing Mona Lisa (2000), and Kiss the Bride (2002).

In 2001, Langton had the leading role in the Fox crime drama series, Fling, During her later career, she starred in a number of smaller films, including Partner(s) (2005) with Jay Harrington and Julie Bowen, and Beautiful Dreamer alongside Colin Egglesfield. In 2007, she starred in the horror film Primeval opposite Dominic Purcell. From 2007 to 2008, she had a recurring role in the NBC drama series, Friday Night Lights. During that same time she co-starred as Charlie Crews' attorney Constance Griffiths in another NBC drama, Life. In later years, Langton guest starred on The Closer, Bones, and Supernatural.

In 2015 Langton participated as a contestant on the Swedish show Allt för Sverige (Everything for Sweden), where she competed against other Americans for the prize to get to know her Swedish family and roots. The series was broadcast on SVT. In the second episode it was revealed that Langton was a relative of actor Adolf Jahr.

== Personal life ==
Langton has one child, a son.

== Filmography ==
=== Film ===
Year	Title	Role	Notes
1994	Terminal Velocity	Jump Junkie	
1996	Beach House	Caitlin	
1996	Listen	Sarah Ross	
1996	Swingers	Nikki	
1997	Mixed Signals	Judy	
1997	The Small Hours	Doug's sister	
1998	Reach the Rock	Lise	
2000	Playing Mona Lisa	Sabrina	
2000	The Replacements	Annabelle Farrell	
2002	Kiss the Bride	Nicoletta 'Niki' Sposato	
2005	Partner(s)	Lucy	
2006	The Benchwarmers	Kathy Dobson	
2006	Beautiful Dreamer	Claire	
2007	Primeval	Aviva Masters	
2012	Chilly Christmas	Lt. Mel Stone	
2014	K-9 Adventures: Legend of the Lost Gold	Courtney Lewis	
2016	The Debt	Kate Campbell	
2017	Saving Christmas	Elizabeth	
2018	Shifting Gears	Carol Williamson	
2018	Soul Sessions	Dr. Katrina Dumont	
2025	Thieves Highway	Sylvia	

=== Television ===
Year	Title	Role	Notes
1992	Freshman Dorm	Nikki	Episode: "Sex, Truth and Theatre"
1992	Beverly Hills, 90210	Suds Lipton	Episode: "The Back Story"
1992	Baywatch	Tanya	Episode: "River of No Return"
1992	California Dreams	Kimberly Blanchard	Episode: "Guess Who's Coming to Brunch"
1994	Moment of Truth: Cult Rescue	Kim McGill	Television film
1995	Eye of the Stalker	Beth	Television film
1995	Extreme	Sarah Bowen	Series regular, 13 episodes
1995	Chicago Hope	Sandra Keyes	Episode: "Hello Goodbye"
1995	The Adventures of Young Indiana Jones	Amy Wharton	Episode: "Winds of Change"
1995	The Single Guy	Amanda	Episodes: "Attraction" and "Midnight"
1995	Party of Five	Courtney	Episode: "Grand Delusions"
1996	Sliders	Daelin Richards	Episode: "As Time Goes By"
1996–98	Melrose Place	Samantha Reilly	Series regular, 68 episodes
1998–99	The Net	Angela Bennett	Series regular, 22 episodes
2001	Fling	Elizabeth Gillcrest	Series regular, 7 episodes
2003	The Break	Sara	Pilot
2005	Weeds	Sharon	Episode: "Dead in the Nethers"
2006	Monk	Terri	Episode: "Mr. Monk Goes to the Dentist"
2007–08	Friday Night Lights	Jackie Miller	Recurring role, 9 episodes
2007–08	Life	Constance Griffiths	Series regular, 11 episodes
2009	The Closer	Detective Ally Moore	Episode: "Dead Man's Hand"
2012	The Mentalist	Pella Goodwin	Episode: "Cherry Picked"
2013	Bones	Christine Brennan	Episode: "The Shot in the Dark"
2013	Supernatural	Hayley	Episode: "Remember the Titans"
2013	The Glades	Nicky Holloway	Episode: "Magic Longworth"
2015	Stolen Dreams	Laura Paddington	Television film; also known as Are You My Daughter?
2015	Allt för Sverige (in Sweden)	herself	A reality game show about tracing one's ancestry
2018	The Good Cop	Joy	Episode: "Why Kill a Busboy?"
2018	The Last Ship	Lt. Maddie Rawlings	Recurring role, 5 episodes
2019	The Passage	Valerie	Episode: "That Never Should Have Happened to You"
