= Jack Brunault =

American actor

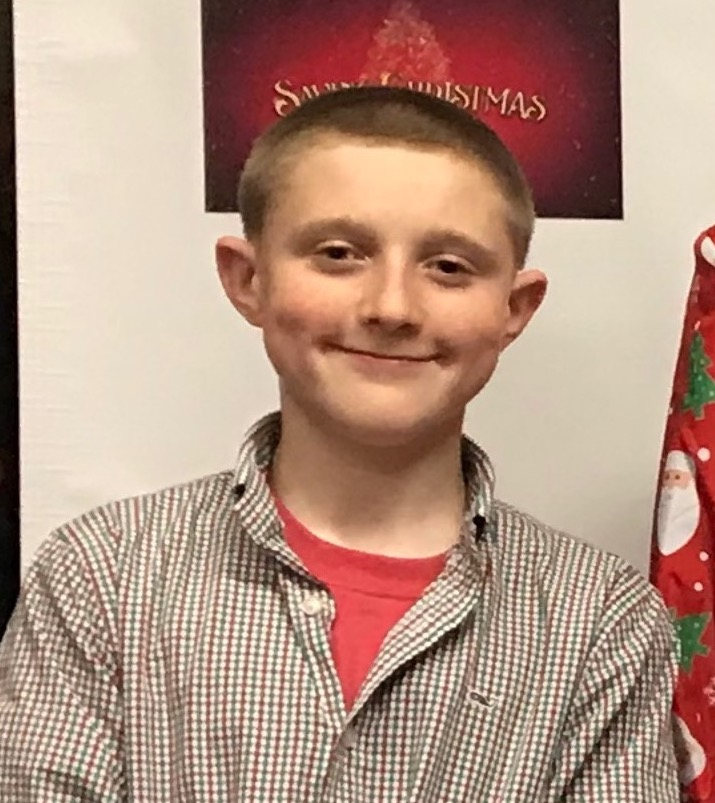
- Brunault at the 2017 premiere of Saving Christmas
- Born: January 13, 2004 (age 21); Norton, Massachusetts, U.S.
- Occupation: Actor
- Years active: 2014–present

Jack Brunault (born January 13, 2004) is an American actor. He is known for his leading role in the film Saving Christmas and for appearing in American Woman as well as the shows Castle Rock, SMILF, and Defending Jacob.

== Life and career ==
Brunault was born in Norton, Massachusetts, son of Greg and Michelle Brunault and younger brother to author Rachel Brunault.

Brunault's first movie appearance came in the movie Sex Tape (2014), where he played a 4th Grade graduate. He landed his first speaking role in the short film, Slimebuck (2015), directed by Tom DeNucci. He next played multiple roles in the short film, No Costume No Candy (2017), directed by Keith Bearden. These performances led to him playing a leading role in the 2017 film Saving Christmas alongside Ed Asner.

Since then, he has played minor roles in the television series SMILF (2017), Castle Rock (2018), and miniseries Defending Jacob (2020). In addition, Brunault appeared in the Jake Scott movie American Woman (2018) as well as Tom DeNucci's Vault (2019).

== Filmography ==
=== Film ===
Year	Title	Role(s)	Notes
2014	Sex Tape	Student at Graduation	
2017	No Costume No Candy	Tom / Pimpkin	
2017	Not for Sale	Luke Wesley	
2017	Saving Christmas	Danny	
2018	American Woman	Patrick - Age 14	
2018	Drawing it Out	Carter	
2019	Vault	Bobby	
2019	The Lost Boy	Edgar	
2020	The Mobfather	Salvatore	Post-production

=== Television ===
Year	Title	Role(s)	Notes
2017	SMILF	Punk	1 episode
2018	Castle Rock	Bailiff	1 episode
2020	Defending Jacob	Student	1 episode
