= Playing Mona Lisa =

- Directed by: Matthew Huffman
- Screenplay by: Marni Freedman; Carlos De Los Rios
- Based on: Two Goldsteins on Acid by Marni Freedman
- Produced by: Sid Sheinberg; Bill Sheinberg; Jonathan Sheinberg
- Starring: Alicia Witt; Harvey Fierstein; Brooke Langton; Johnny Galecki; Ivan Sergei; Marlo Thomas; Elliott Gould
- Cinematography: James Glennon
- Edited by: Sloane Klevin
- Music by: Carlos Rodriguez
- Production company: The Bubble Factory
- Distributed by: Buena Vista Pictures Distribution
- Release date: October 27, 2000 (San Francisco)
- Running time: 97 minutes
- Country: United States
- Language: English
- Budget: $5.5 million

Playing Mona Lisa is a 2000 American comedy film directed by Matthew Huffman and starring Alicia Witt, Harvey Fierstein, Johnny Galecki, Elliott Gould, Marlo Thomas, Molly Hagan, and Brooke Langton. It is based on a play by Marni Freedman.

== Plot ==
Everything goes wrong all at once in gifted 23-year-old pianist Claire Goldstein's life. San Francisco has an earthquake, she loses her apartment, her boyfriend Jeremy dumps her and she misses out on an important piano competition.

Claire is forced to move home with her parents (Marlo Thomas, Elliott Gould), where sister Jenine (Molly Hagan) is busy planning a wedding. Claire's mom is into the occult, her teacher (Harvey Fierstein) tries to arrange auditions and friends try to hook her up with a new romantic prospect, Eddie, adding to the complications in her life.

== Cast ==
- Alicia Witt as Claire Goldstein
- Harvey Fierstein as Bennett
- Brooke Langton as Sabrina
- Johnny Galecki as Arthur
- Elliott Gould as Bernie Goldstein, Claire's father
- Marlo Thomas as Sheila Goldstein, Claire's mother
- Ivan Sergei as Eddie/Carl/Ben
- Tammy Townsend as Alice
- Molly Hagan as Jenine Goldstein, Claire's older sister
- Joe Mazza as Barry, Jenine's fiancé
- Estelle Harris as Aunt Velva
- Pat Crawford Brown as Grandma Ida Weinberg
- Zachary Kranzler as Jeremy
- Sulo Williams as Manny
- Sandra Bernhard as Bibi Carlson

== Production ==
=== Development and writing ===
Based on Marni Freedman's play Two Goldsteins on Acid.

=== Filming ===
The film was shot on location in San Francisco in the spring of 1999.

=== Musical score ===
Composed by Carlos Rodriguez the film's score includes a variety of music. From contemporary songs to classical piano, salsa, and polka.

== Release ==
The film screened at the U.S. Comedy Arts Festival in Aspen, Colorado February 9–13, 2000. It later screened at the Gen Art Film Festival in New York City April 26 - May 2, 2000, and was shown at the Stony Brook Film Festival July 19–29, 2000. It opened in San Francisco on October 27, 2000.

The DVD for the film was released on April 17, 2001 by Buena Vista Pictures Distribution.

== Reception ==
As of April 2024, Playing Mona Lisa has a 62% approval rating on internet review aggregator Rotten Tomatoes, based on 14 reviews.

Merle Bertrand of Film Threat gave the film a mixed review, noting that despite featuring some funny moments, "Playing Mona Lisa plays like a sitcom pilot on steroids. The cast shamelessly overplays their nitwit roles for laughs, which are rarely present, and the underlying idiocy of the various plotline twists becomes so irritating that one wishes mobsters from a Scorsese film could stop by to shoot off a few kneecaps." In another review by Film Threat, it was given some praise: "Though not tremendously original and definitely not even remotely "edgy," Playing Mona Lisa is nonetheless a pleasant enough film, gently amusing and filled with enough familiar and/or attractive faces and good-natured gags to make the time pass by easily."

Wesley Morris of the San Francisco Examiner described the film as an "irritatingly overwritten" domestic comedy, comparing it to a "canceled Fox dramedy [series]." Buzz McClain of AllMovie gave the film a two out of five-star rating, noting: "A lighter touch for this would-be screwball comedy was called for than what director Matthew Huffman gives it..., so hateful as the antagonizing daughter on TV's Cybill, occasionally rises above the material and generates genuine sympathy, and she convincingly plays the brief classical piano parts herself... But a movie that gets its title from a lame gag recited in the film (it refers to the way single women are supposed to smile at men) is doomed from the start."

The film won the Audience Choice Award for Best Feature in 2000 at the Stony Brook Film Festival. It also won the Film Discovery Jury Award for Best Actor Alicia Witt in 2000 at U.S. Comedy Arts Festival.
