= The Net (American TV series) =

American television series

- Based on: The Net by John Brancato and Michael Ferris
- Developed by: Irwin Winkler; Rob Cowan; Deborah Pratt
- Starring: Brooke Langton; Joseph Bottoms; Tim Curry; Eric Szmanda
- Composer: Russ Landau
- Country of origin: United States
- Original language: English
- No. of seasons: 1
- No. of episodes: 22

Production
- Running time: 60 minutes
- Production company: Columbia TriStar Television

Original release
- Network: USA Network
- Release: July 18, 1998 – March 27, 1999

The Net is an American drama series based on the 1995 film of the same name. The series starred Brooke Langton as Angela Bennett, the character Sandra Bullock played in the film. Produced in Vancouver, British Columbia, Canada, the series originally aired for one season on the USA Network from July 18, 1998, until canceled on March 27, 1999.

== Synopsis ==
In Seattle, Washington, computer expert and software-design consultant Angela Bennett (Brooke Langton) accidentally receives a top secret email with information about an elite terrorist organization called the Praetorians. Angela, whose online avatar is "Angel", soon discovers that the Praetorians' goal is to take control of people's lives through the use of computers. The Praetorians become aware of Angela's knowledge of them and steal her identity, placing her new identity, Elizabeth Marx, on the FBI's Ten Most Wanted List. Angela is framed for the murder of her neighbor, Tillie, and goes on the run.

Sean Trelawney, the head of the Praetorian security, makes it his personal mission to capture or kill Angela. Angela soon discovers that 14 years earlier, in 1984, her father used to be attached to a secret government project in an underground facility at Copper Canyon. After the project was over, Angela's father, seemingly, abandoned his family, but now Angela believes, he went into hiding to keep his family safe. Dr. Phillip Wayland, one of the last surviving members of the research and development team, assists Angela in getting her to the Copper Canyon facility but is killed when the facility is blown up by the Praetorians. Angela, with the help of a mysterious online persona named "Sorcerer" (voiced by Tim Curry), sets out to stop the Praetorians and win back her true identity while staying one step ahead of both the FBI and the Praetorians.

Initially, Angela communicates with Sorcerer via a portable prototype computer, but once the device is accidentally destroyed by a riding lawnmower, she is forced to communicate with him via standard computer equipment and internet cafés as she travels the country evading the authorities and attempting to thwart the Praetorians. Eventually, Angela meets 17-year-old computer genius Jacob Resh, who reveals himself to be "Sorcerer". To Angela's surprise, the New York City born and raised Jacob is not British at all like his online voice made him seem to be. During the early 1980s, Jacob's father had worked alongside Angela's father in Copper Canyon but was killed by the Praetorians, who made it look like a suicide. Angela deduces that it was Jacob who sent her the email that set the Praetorians upon her and destroyed her world in the first place. Jacob, whose mother abandoned him in 1988, lives in his widowed grandmother's basement and lives off the royalty payments from a video game he designed when he was 13. He convinces Angela to continue working with him to bring down the Praetorians and Jacob promises to continue to help Angela look for her missing father. To Angela's dismay, they ultimately learn that her father died in 1985.

Eventually, Mr. Olivier, the former Praetorian Board of Directors Chairman, turns on the Praetorians due to them having him committed to an institution and provides Angela and her friends with the means to infiltrate and destroy the Praetorians' main base of operations. Trelawney escapes the invasion but Mr. White, the head of the Praetorians, commits suicide by overdosing on a new synthetic drug called Zero. The Praetorians are destroyed. After Angela's case is reviewed by the FBI, she is exonerated. Not only does Angela get her identity back, she is also given the opportunity to work for the newly formed Center for Intrusion Control, based in her hometown of Seattle. Trelawney, Angela's primary nemesis for the better part of the prior year, infiltrates the FBI training grounds in Quantico, Virginia, and attempts to shoot Angela while on the shooting range, but is gunned down by Angela's new boss, Walter Cizelski, instead.

Angela's first assignment after graduating from her eight-week training course is to put an end to an online fight ring that almost always ends in the death of one of its participants. Meanwhile, Jacob has graduated high school and relocates to Seattle to attend the University of Washington. However, he still has time to assist Angela on her next assignment—stopping the maker of a chemical weapon from distributing it on a larger scale. To that end, Jacob poses as a transfer student at an Oregon high school while Angela pretends to be a substitute chemistry teacher. Ultimately, the high school senior responsible for creating the chemical weapon is shot and incapacitated while trying to deliver it to his buyers, all three of whom are killed by the authorities during the transaction. Angela's final assignment before the series is cancelled is to find out the identity of a killer who uses video surveillance footage of his victims to stalk them before he murders them. Angela finds herself as the latest target but she and Walter are able to turn the tables on the killer and apprehend him.

== Cast ==
=== Main ===
- Brooke Langton as Angela Bennett (episodes 1-22)
- Joseph Bottoms as Sean Trelawney (episodes 1–19; episodes 20-22 credit only)
- Tim Curry as the Voice of the Sorcerer (episodes 1–10)
- Eric Szmanda as Jacob "Sorcerer" Resh (episodes 10–22)
- Bruce Abbott as Agent Walter Cizelski (episodes 19–22)

=== Recurring ===
- Kelli Taylor as Anna Kelly (Episodes 1, 2, 3, 4, 7, 9, 18)
- Mackenzie Gray as Greg Hearney (Episodes 1, 2, 3, 5, 6, 7, 8, 11, 14, 15, 18 (credit only))
- Jim Byrnes as Mr. Olivier (Episodes 4, 6, 9, 10, 11, 12, 13, 15, 19)
- Dion Luther as Carl/Michael White (Episodes 4 (as Carl), 12, 14, 15, 16, 17, 19)

=== Guest stars ===
- Jack Coleman as Dr. Steven Graf (episode 3: "Transplant")
- Clyde Kusatsu as Greg (episode 6: "Kill the Buddha")
- Keegan Connor Tracy as Nadine (episode 8: "Jump Vector")
- Jeffrey Combs as Max Copernicus (episode 16: "Lunatic Fringe")
- Dwayne "The Rock" Johnson as Brody (episode 20: "Last Man Standing")
- Jeremy Renner as Ned (episode 21: "Chem Lab")

== Production ==
The stunt coordinator for the series was David Jacox.

== Episodes ==
No.	Title	Directed by	Written by	Original release date	Prod. code
1	"Deleted"	Bradford May	Irwin Winkler & Rob Cowan	July 18, 1998	101
2	"North by Northwestern"	Jim Charleston	Jacob Epstein	July 25, 1998	102
3	"Transplant"	George Mendeluk	Deborah M. Pratt	August 1, 1998	103
4	"Bulls and Bears"	Helen Shaver	Story by : Kim Gruenenfelder; Teleplay by : Larry Barber & Paul Barber	August 8, 1998	106
5	"Death of an Angel"	Patrick Norris	Robert Bielak	August 15, 1998	105
6	"Kill the Buddha"	Adam Nimoy	Larry Barber & Paul Barber	August 22, 1998	107
7	"Fireball"	William Gereghty	John Kirk	August 29, 1998	108
8	"Jump Vector"	Scott Paulin	Karl Holman	October 3, 1998	109
9	"Go Like You Know"	David Winkler	Larry Barber & Paul Barber	October 10, 1998	110
10	"Harvest"	Peter DeLuise	John Kirk	October 17, 1998	111
11	"Diamonds Aren't Forever"	Michael Robison	Tracy Keenan Wynn	November 28, 1998	112
12	"Pandora's Box"	Neill Fearnley	Karl Holman	December 5, 1998	113
13	"Sample"	David Winkler	John Kirk	December 12, 1998	114
14	"Lucy's Life"	Jefferson Kibbee	Larry Barber & Paul Barber	December 20, 1998	115
15	"Pay the Line"	Les Landau	Lawrence Meyers	January 9, 1999	116
16	"Lunatic Fringe"	Oscar Costo	Thomas E. Daniels	January 16, 1999	117
17	"In Dreams"	Helaine Head	Allison Hock	January 23, 1999	118
18	"Y2K: Total System Failure"	Randy Zisk	Nan Hagan	January 30, 1999	104
19	"Zero"	E. J. Foerster	Larry Barber & Paul Barber	March 6, 1999	119
20	"Last Man Standing"	Peter DeLuise	Karl Holman	March 13, 1999	120
21	"Chem Club"	Anson Williams	John Kirk	March 20, 1999	121
22	"Eye-see-you.com"	Scott Paulin	Story by : Wolfe Bowart & Chris Adams & Ken Lang; Teleplay by : Wolfe Bowart & Chris Adams	March 27, 1999	122

== Home media ==
Sony Pictures Home Entertainment released the complete series on DVD in Region 2 on May 15, 2006. It was also released on DVD in Region 4 on 21 March 2006.

The order of the episodes on the DVD release is in production order instead of broadcast order, which differed slightly; airing episode #18 is #4, and episodes 5 and 6 are in reverse order, on the DVD release.
