= Tidan =

- Location within Västra Götaland Location within Sweden
- Coordinates: 58°34′N 14°00′E
- Country: Sweden
- Province: Västergötland
- County: Västra Götaland County
- Municipality: Skövde Municipality

Area
  - Total: 1.32 km^{2} (0.51 sq mi)

Population (31 December 2010)
  - Total: 935
  - Density: 707/km^{2} (1,830/sq mi)
- Time zone: UTC+1 (CET)
  - Summer (DST): UTC+2 (CEST)

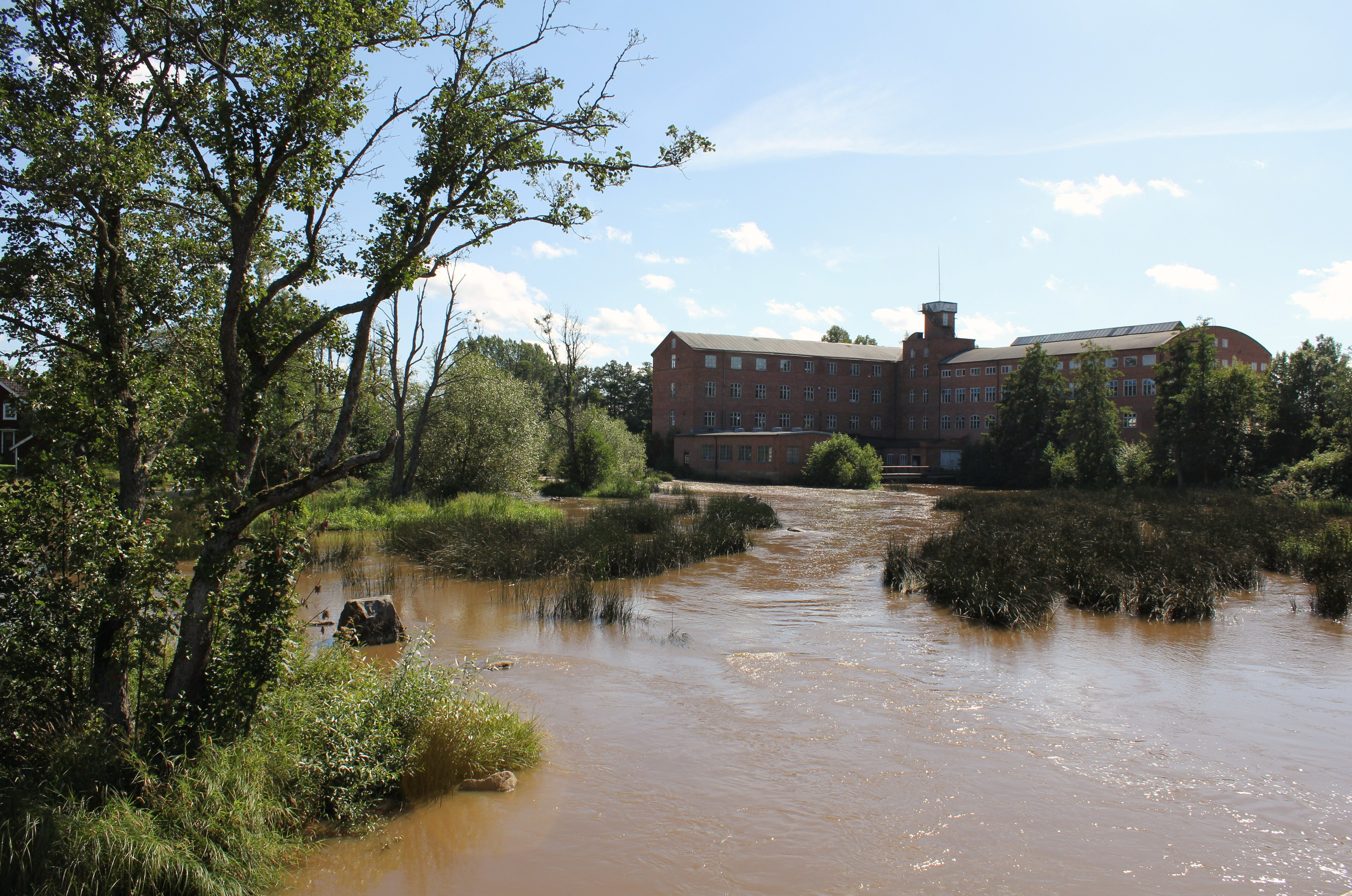
Wool factory in Tidan, Skövde municipality. The river Tidan.

Tidan is a locality situated in Skövde Municipality, Västra Götaland County, Sweden with 935 inhabitants in 2010.
