= Hasselfors =

- Location within Örebro Location within Sweden
- Coordinates: 59°05′N 14°39′E
- Country: Sweden
- Province: Närke
- County: Örebro County
- Municipality: Laxå Municipality

Area
  - Total: 1.27 km^{2} (0.49 sq mi)

Population (31 December 2010)
  - Total: 428
  - Density: 338/km^{2} (880/sq mi)
- Time zone: UTC+1 (CET)
  - Summer (DST): UTC+2 (CEST)

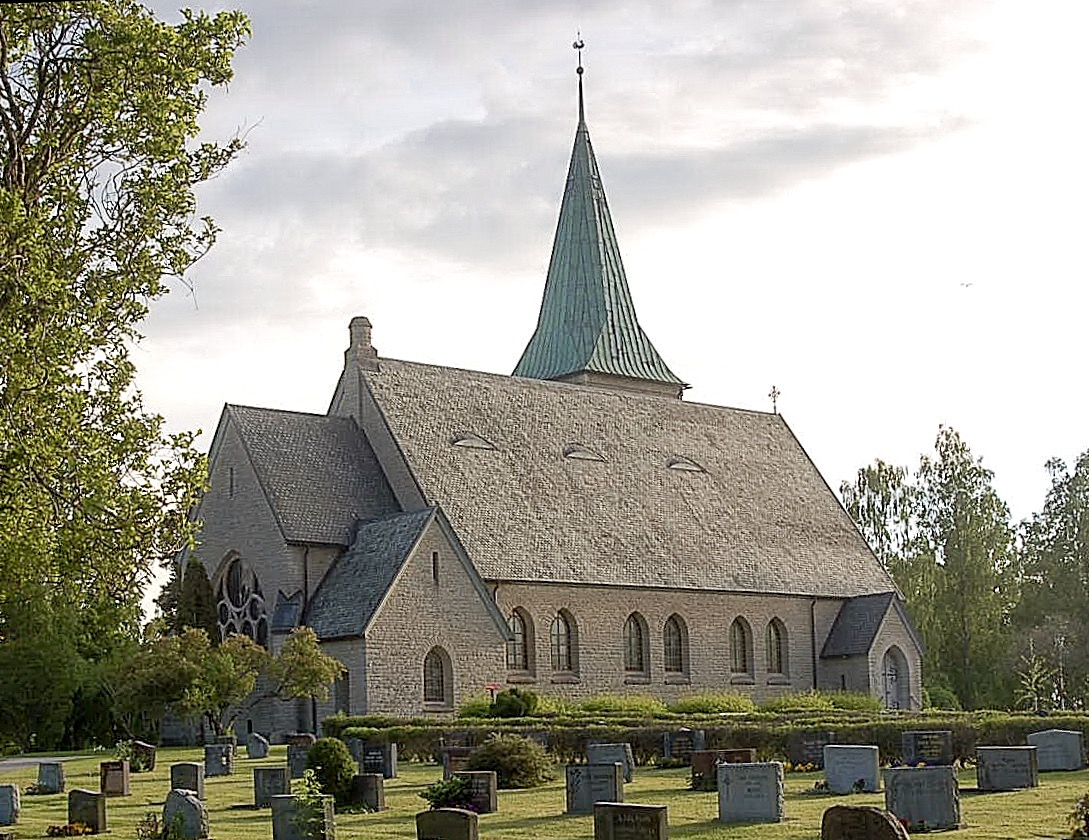
Skagershults kyrka, Hasselfors, Laxå Sweden.

Hasselfors (Swedish pronunciation: [ˈhâsːɛlˌfɔʂ]) is a locality situated in Laxå Municipality, Örebro County, Sweden with 428 inhabitants in 2010.
