= Västerlösa =

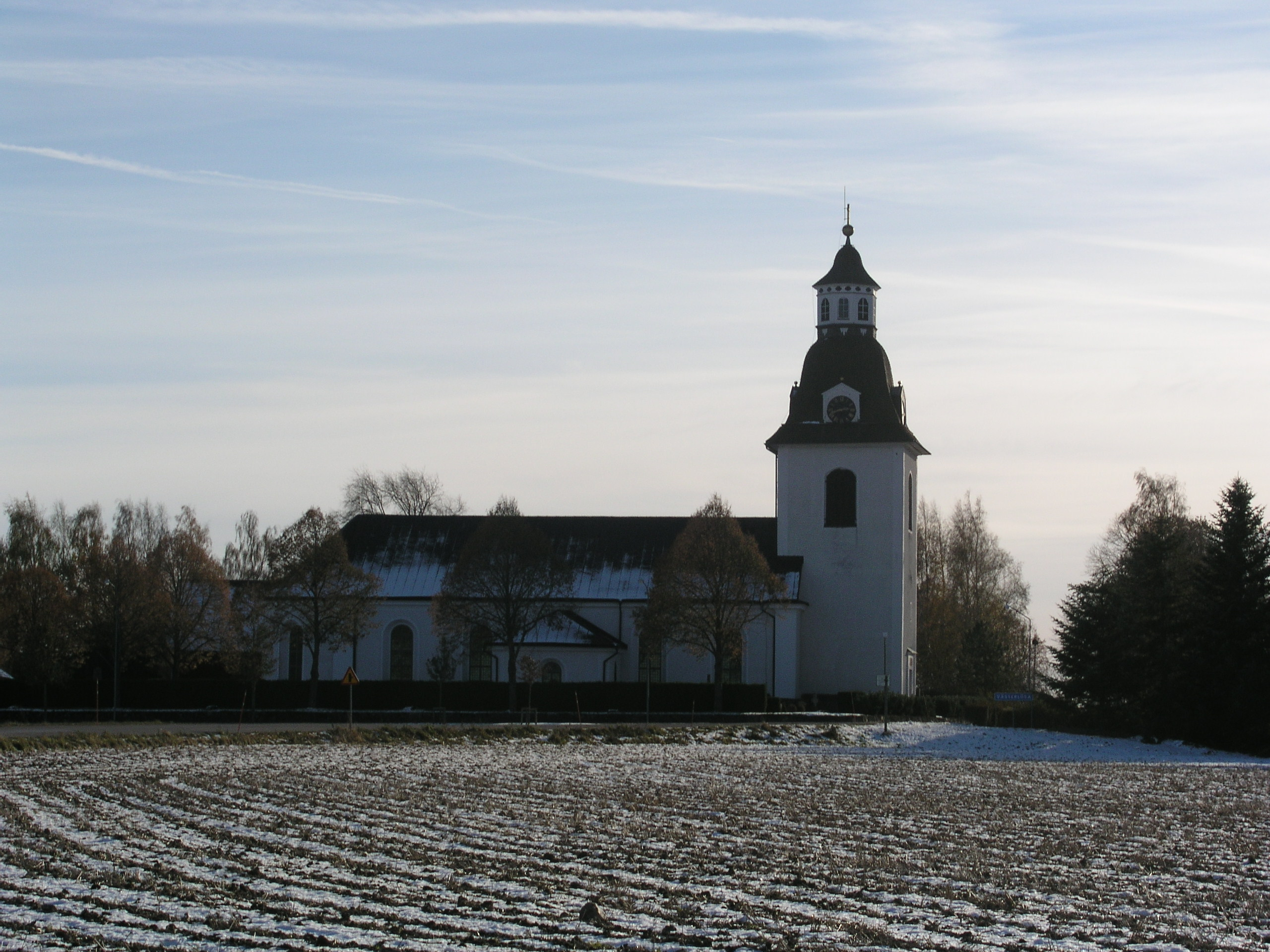
- Västerlösa Church

- Location within Östergötland Location within Sweden
- Coordinates: 58°25′N 15°21′E
- Country: Sweden
- Province: Östergötland
- County: Östergötland County
- Municipality: Linköping Municipality

Area
  - Total: 0.45 km^{2} (0.17 sq mi)

Population (31 December 2010)
  - Total: 206
  - Density: 458/km^{2} (1,190/sq mi)
- Time zone: UTC+1 (CET)
  - Summer (DST): UTC+2 (CEST)

Västerlösa is a locality situated in Linköping Municipality, Östergötland County, Sweden with 192 inhabitants in 2010.
