= Gustave (crocodile) =

Large man-eating Nile crocodile in Burundi

- A photograph of Gustave for National Geographic, taken by Martin Best
- Species: Crocodylus niloticus (Nile crocodile)
- Sex: Male
- Hatched: c. 1955 (age 70–71)
- Known for: Allegedly killing up to 300 people
- Residence: Ruzizi River and Lake Tanganyika
- Weight: ≥ 2,000 lb (907 kg) (estimated)

Gustave is a man-eating male Nile crocodile rumored to have killed as many as 200-300 people in the area of the Ruzizi river and the northern shores of Lake Tanganyika in Burundi, though one more recent estimate states the true figure is probably 60 people or fewer. He obtained a mythical status and in 2004 it was reported that he was greatly feared by the people in the region.

Gustave was named by Patrice Faye, a herpetologist who has been studying him since the late 1990s. Much of what is known about Gustave stems from the film Capturing the Killer Croc, which aired in 2004 on PBS. The film documents an attempt to capture Gustave.

== Description ==
Gustave's exact length and weight are unknown. In 2002, National Geographic estimated he could be "easily more than 20 feet (6.1 m)" long, and weigh more than 2,000 pounds (907 kg). He is estimated to be over 60 years old and "still growing".

In the late 1990s or early 2000s, the crocodile was seen with three bullet wound scars. His right shoulder blade was also found to be deeply wounded. Circumstances surrounding the four scars are unknown. Scientists who have studied Gustave claim that his uncommon size and weight impede his ability to hunt the usual agile prey of Nile crocodiles such as fish, antelope and zebra, forcing him to attack larger animals such as hippopotamus, buffalo and humans. Despite frequently being referred to as a man-eater, a popular local warning says his victims' corpses were often left uneaten.

== Capture attempt ==
In Capturing the Killer Croc, Patrice Faye and other scientists attempted to capture Gustave over a period of two years. A trap cage weighing 2,000 pounds (907 kg) and measuring nearly 30 feet (9.1 m) in length was developed. The team then located Gustave, installed and baited the trap, also placing a hidden infrared camera inside. Several kinds of bait were used, yet none of them attracted Gustave or any other creature. The scientists then strategically installed three giant snares on certain banks to increase their chances of capture; although smaller crocodiles were caught by the traps, Gustave was not.

In the last week before being forced to leave the country due to an ongoing civil conflict, the team placed a live goat in the cage. As the result of a thunderstorm, the camera failed to operate and the following morning the cage was found partially submerged and the goat was gone. The team speculated that the rising waters helped the goat to escape or that the cage had failed, but without the camera recording, no conclusion could be drawn.

== Sightings and possible death ==
In 2009, Gustave appeared in the Ruzizi river near Lake Tanganyika.

In a 2019 article about travel in Burundi, a writer for Travel Africa Magazine reported learning that Gustave had been killed. It is not said how, where and by whom he was killed and no photographic evidence has ever surfaced, leaving these claims dubious until concrete evidence is brought forward.

Larger crocodile species like the Nile crocodile have a potential maximum life span of 70 to 100 years.

== See also ==
- Lolong, the largest crocodile in captivity until his death on February 10, 2013.
