= Brandstorp =

Brandstorp Brandstorp
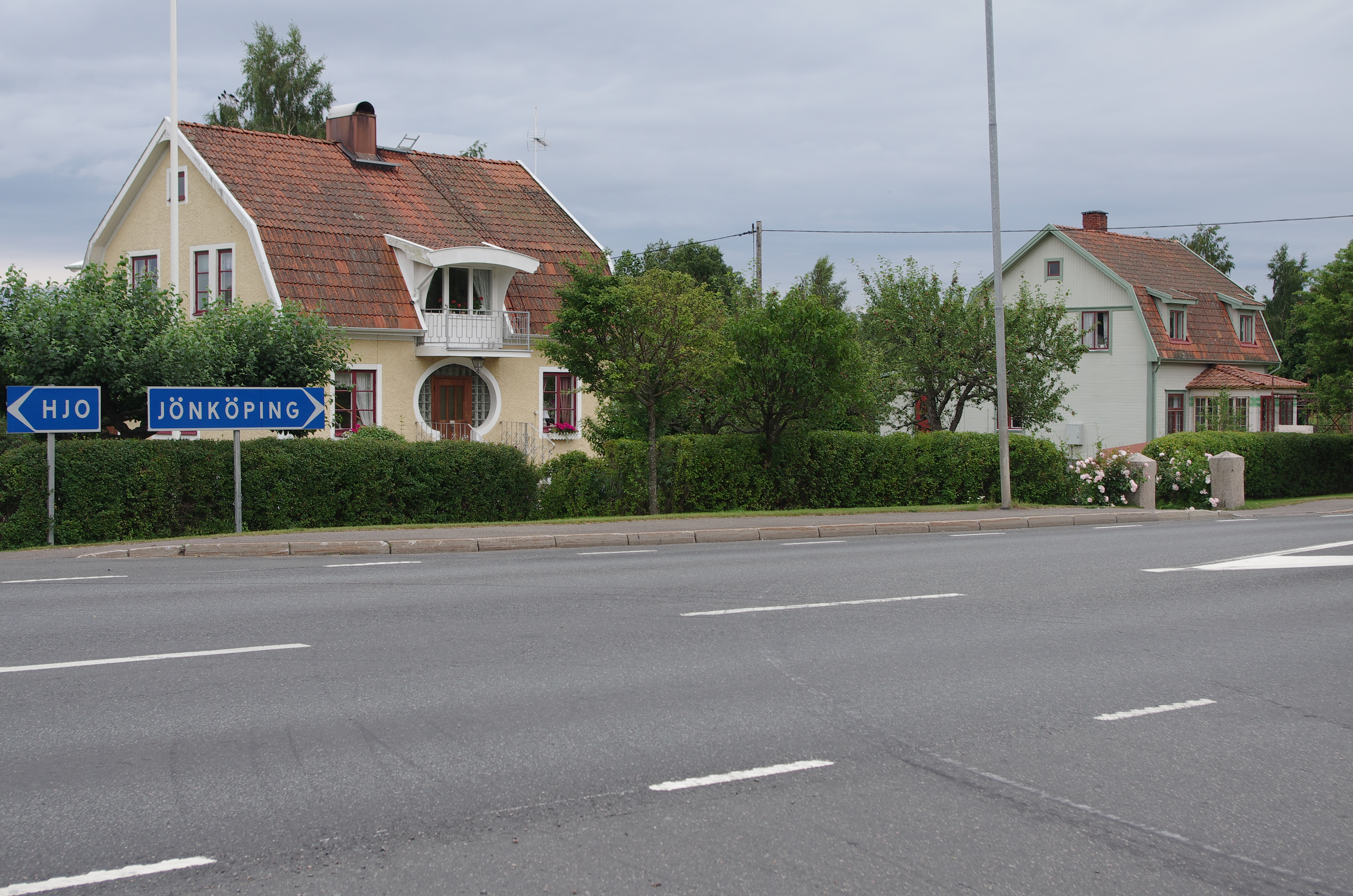
- Brandstorp in July 2011

- Location within Sweden
- Coordinates: 58°05′45″N 14°12′20″E
- Country: Sweden
- County: Jönköping
- Municipality: Habo

Population (2010)
  - Total: 116
- Time zone: UTC+1 (CET)
  - Summer (DST): UTC+2 (CEST)

Brandstorp is a minor locality situated in Habo Municipality in Jönköping County, Sweden. It had 116 inhabitants in 2010. (updated 8 October 2012)

== See also ==
- Brandstorp Church
