= Johanna Olson-Kennedy =

American physician

- Education: Chicago Medical School, Children's Hospital Los Angeles
- Occupation: Physician

Johanna Olson-Kennedy is an American physician. She is board-certified in pediatrics and adolescent medicine and was the medical director of the Center for Transyouth Health and Development at Children's Hospital Los Angeles until its closure in July 2025.

Olson-Kennedy has co-authored multiple studies on transgender youth. She has served as a frequent expert witness in court cases, and as of 2024 is the president-elect of the United States Professional Association for Transgender Health (USPATH). She was implicated in a 2024 controversy for choosing to delay publishing a National Institutes of Health study on the use of puberty blockers to improve mental health of children.

== Biography ==
Olson-Kennedy is a physician who is board-certified in pediatrics and adolescent medicine. She specializes in the care of children and teenagers with gender dysphoria and youth with HIV and chronic pain. She was the medical director of the Center for Transyouth Health and Development at Children's Hospital Los Angeles until its closure in July 2025 in response to Executive Order 14187 due to its reliance on public insurance.

Olson-Kennedy has co-authored multiple studies on transgender youth. These include studies on chest reconstruction, gender identity development, physiological responses to gender-affirming hormones, and the use of puberty blockers. She is a critic of a "gatekeeping" approach to youth gender medicine, according to The Economist.

In 2012, Olson-Kennedy became the medical director of the Center for Transyouth Health and Development at Children's Hospital Los Angeles, the largest transgender youth clinic in the United States as of 2024. In 2015, she began to lead a $10 million NIH-funded research project to study youth gender medicine, described as "by far the largest such project in America" by The Economist. She has served as a frequent expert witness in court cases, and as of 2024 is the president-elect of the United States Professional Association for Transgender Health (USPATH).

In October 2024, The New York Times reported that Olson-Kennedy had chosen not to publish a long-running study on puberty blockers funded by the National Institutes of Health, which showed that blockers did not lead to improvements in mental health of children. Olson-Kennedy attributed this to the children already being in good mental health at the study's outset—an explanation The New York Times noted was inconsistent with an earlier statement by Olson-Kennedy and her research team, which had recorded a quarter of the studied cohort as depressed or suicidal before receiving puberty blockers. Olson-Kennedy said she was concerned that the study's results could be used by political opponents in the US to argue in court that "we shouldn't use blockers because it doesn't impact [transgender adolescents]". As summarized by The New York Times, other researchers involved in the study, including Amy Tishelman, were "alarmed by the idea of delaying results that would have immediate implications for families around the world." However, other studies from the larger NIH project have been published, including one that found "improvements in life and body satisfaction" in transgender and nonbinary adolescents who took estrogen or testosterone as well as "declines in depression and anxiety."

In December 2024, Olson-Kennedy was sued by a 20-year old female detransitioner, alleging she had caused permanent harm by a rushed diagnosis of gender dysphoria "mere minutes" after first seeing the plaintiff at age 12, who went on to receive puberty blockers, testosterone, and a double mastectomy at age 14. The lawsuit also names the St. Francis Hospital in San Francisco and a second doctor as defendants, alleging that the latter had "rubber-stamped" the mastectomy.

The same day, a group of Republican senators published a letter addressed to the director of the NIH which inquired further information about the NIH project and reiterated the importance of transparency in the medical research that the NIH supports with public funds. All senators involved except for one had previously sponsored a ban on youth gender-affirming care. This letter follows an earlier November 4 letter from the House Committee on Oversight and Accountability to the director whose focal point was again the unpublished study by Johanna Olson-Kennedy.

== See also ==
- 2020s anti-LGBTQ movement in the United States
- Leeds lawsuit (Bell v Tavistock)

== Selected publications ==
- Olson-Kennedy, Johanna (2016-05-01). "Mental Health Disparities Among Transgender Youth: Rethinking the Role of Professionals". JAMA Pediatrics. 170 (5): 423–424. doi:10.1001/jamapediatrics.2016.0155. ISSN 2168-6203. PMID 26998945.
- Olson-Kennedy, J; Cohen-Kettenis, P. T.; Kreukels, B.P.C; Meyer-Bahlburg, H.F.L; Garofalo, R; Meyer, W; Rosenthal, S.M. (April 2016). "Research Priorities for Gender Nonconforming/Transgender Youth: Gender Identity Development and Biopsychosocial Outcomes". Current Opinion in Endocrinology, Diabetes, and Obesity. 23 (2): 172–179. doi:10.1097/MED.0000000000000236. ISSN 1752-296X. PMC 4807860. PMID 26825472.
- Olson, Johanna; Forbes, Catherine; Belzer, Marvin (2011-02-01). "Management of the Transgender Adolescent". Archives of Pediatrics & Adolescent Medicine. 165 (2): 171–176. doi:10.1001/archpediatrics.2010.275. ISSN 1072-4710. PMID 21300658.
- Olson, Johanna; Garofalo, Robert (June 2014). "The peripubertal gender-dysphoric child: puberty suppression and treatment paradigms". Pediatric Annals. 43 (6): e132–137. doi:10.3928/00904481-20140522-08. ISSN 1938-2359. PMID 24972421.
- Olson, Johanna; Schrager, Sheree M.; Belzer, Marvin; Simons, Lisa K.; Clark, Leslie F. (October 2015). "Baseline Physiologic and Psychosocial Characteristics of Transgender Youth Seeking Care for Gender Dysphoria". The Journal of Adolescent Health. 57 (4): 374–380. doi:10.1016/j.jadohealth.2015.04.027. ISSN 1879-1972. PMC 5033041. PMID 26208863.
