= Totebo =

- Location within Kalmar Location within Sweden
- Coordinates: 57°38′N 16°12′E
- Country: Sweden
- Province: Småland
- County: Kalmar County
- Municipality: Västervik Municipality

Area
  - Total: 0.50 km^{2} (0.19 sq mi)

Population (31 December 2010)
  - Total: 239
  - Density: 478/km^{2} (1,240/sq mi)
- Time zone: UTC+1 (CET)
  - Summer (DST): UTC+2 (CEST)

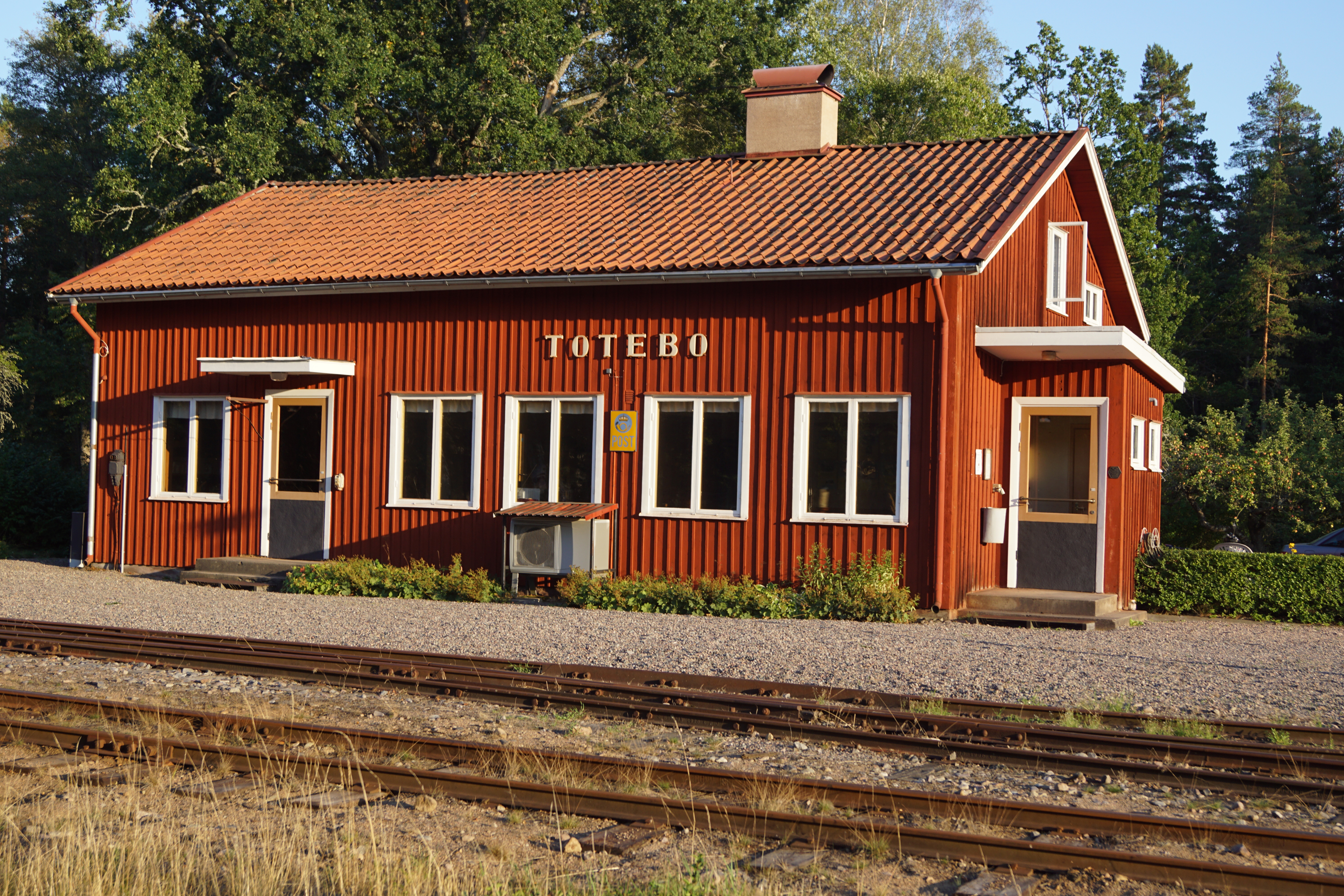
Totebo station

Totebo is a locality situated in Västervik Municipality, Kalmar County, Sweden, with 239 inhabitants in 2010.
