= Pershyttan =

Coordinates: 59°30′N 15°00′E

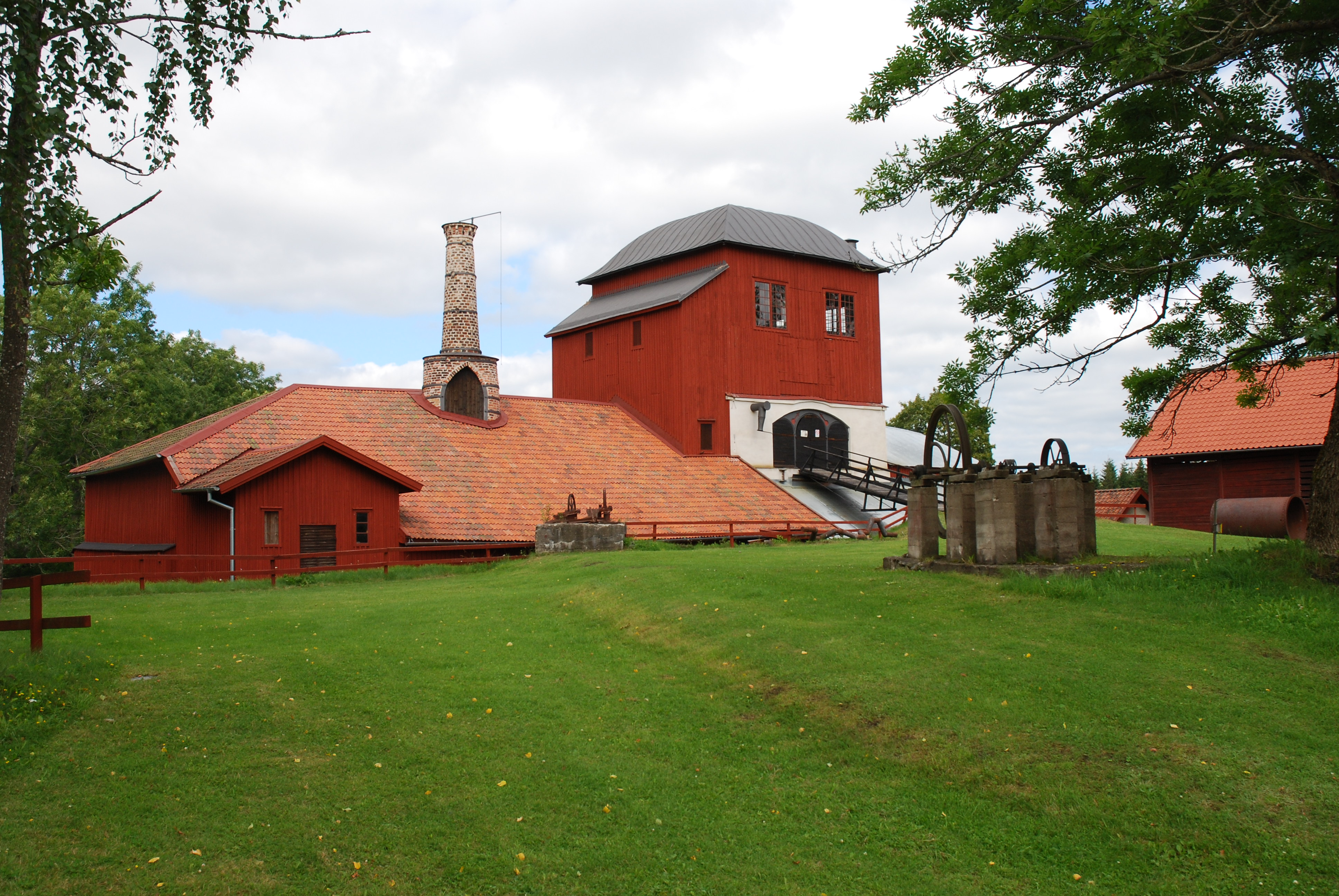
The 1856 blast furnace in Pershyttan. Photo: Bengt Oberger

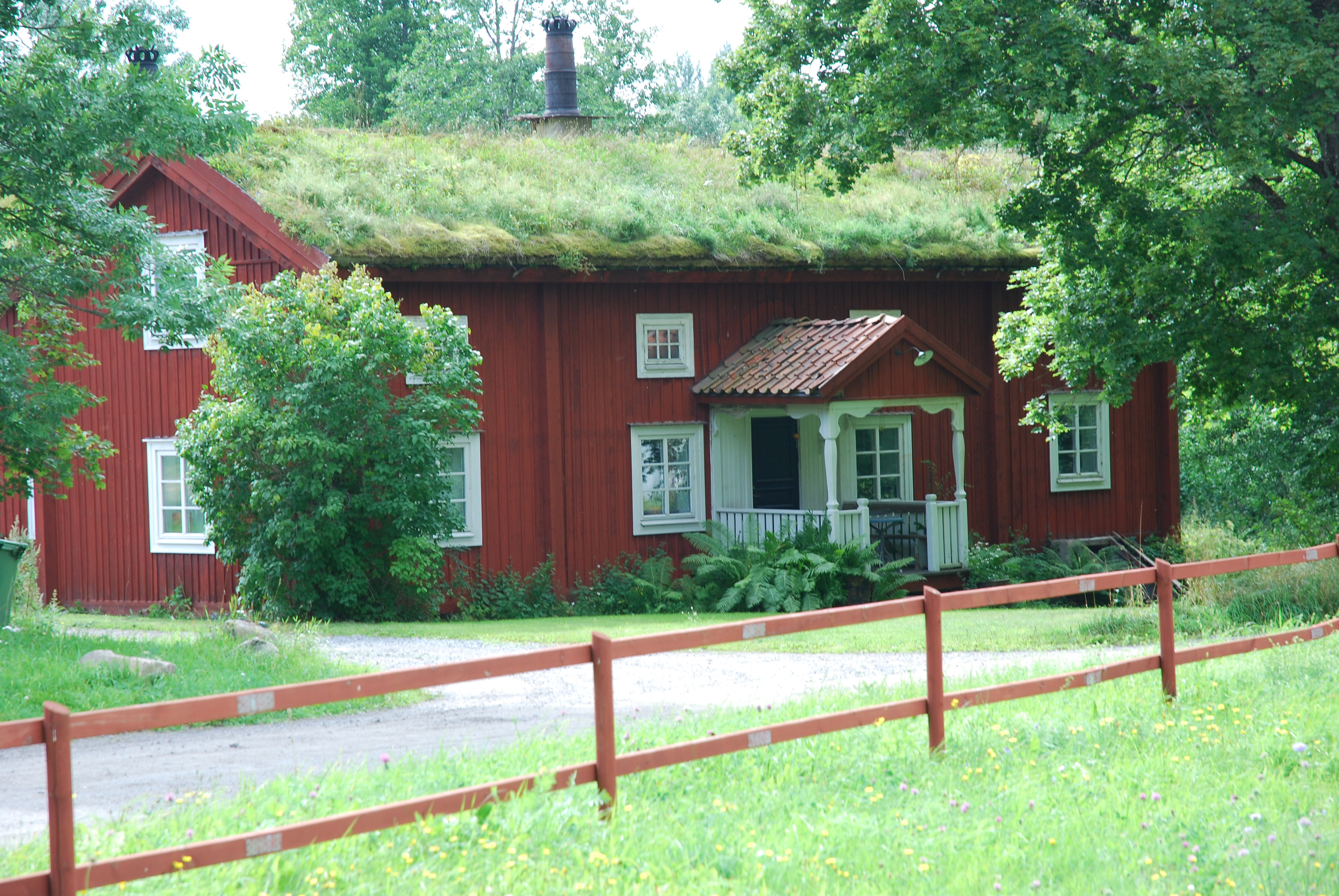
Mansion used by a mining manager. Photo: Bengt Oberger

Pershyttan is a small mining town approximately 3 kilometres (1.9 mi) south-southwest of Nora, Sweden (174 km west of Stockholm). It has been restored and kept mainly as a working museum of Bergslagen's mining and iron handling which started in the early 14th century.

One of Sweden's best preserved charcoal-fuelled blast furnaces from 1856 can be found in Pershyttan. In the area is also one of the biggest working water wheels.

The two best known mines in the area are Lockgruvan, which dates back to the Middle Ages, and Storgruvan.

Storgruvan is also called Moon Mine due to it being the site of the moonbase analogue test project, with the aim to research and explore techniques for building an underground base on the moon.

Some goals of the moon mine project are:

- Outdoor design to provide an environment with an outdoor feeling.
- Cultivation of vegetables with help of optical fibers transferred sunlight or with fluorescent light sources.
- Low-volume production of metal objects. Through means of welding.
- Housing design.
- Outdoor-like environment inside cave corridors with runner tracks.
- Mining and mineral extraction with minimal equipment.
