= Bottnaryd Church =

Coordinates: 57.7742°N 13.8229°E

- Bottnaryds kyrka
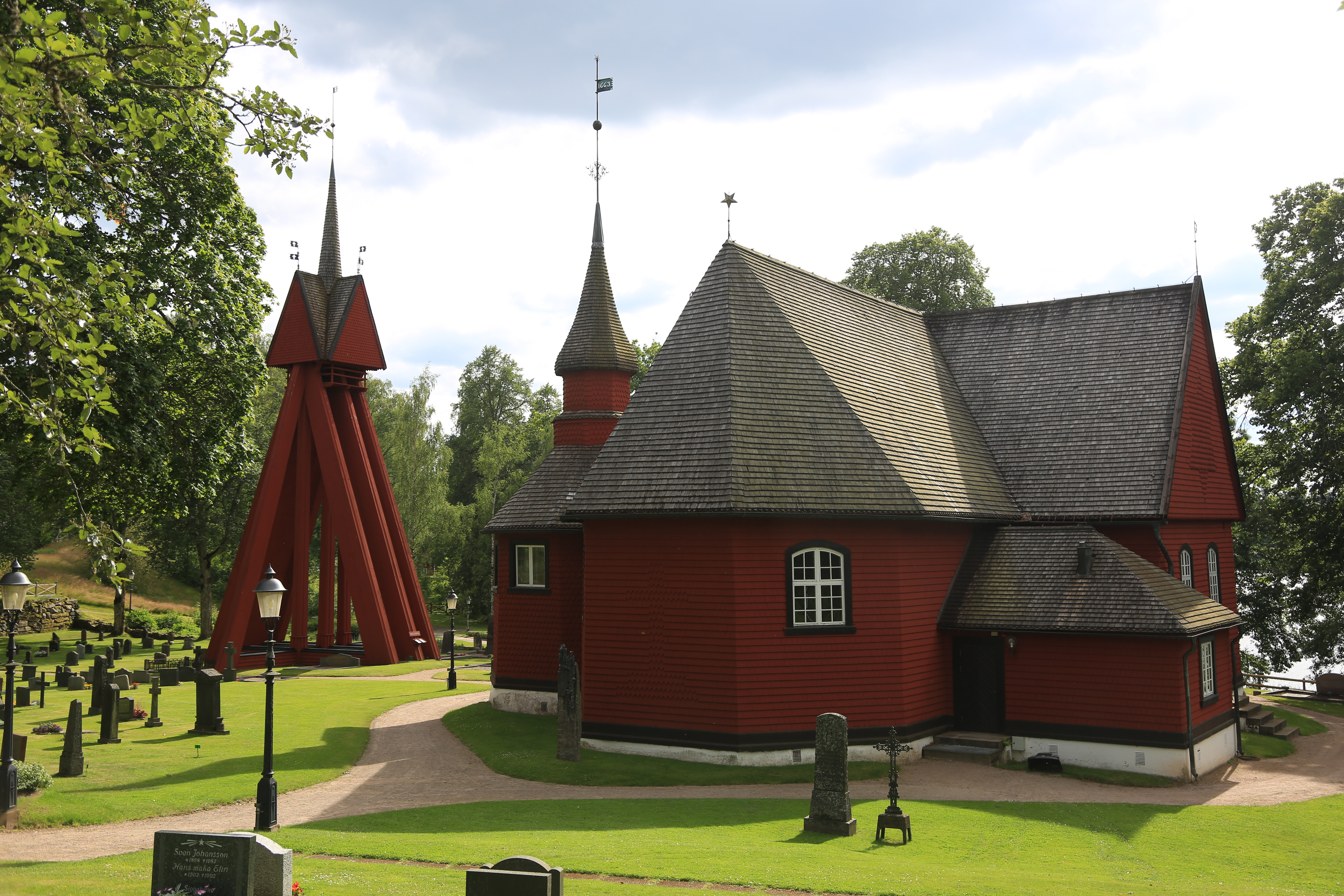
- Bottnaryd Church in July 2014
- Bottnaryd Church
- Location: Bottnaryd
- Country: Sweden
- Denomination: Church of Sweden

History
- Consecrated: 1667

Administration
- Diocese: Diocese of Skara
- Parish: Norra Mo

Bottnaryd Church (Swedish: Bottnaryds kyrka) is a historic church building in Bottnaryd, Sweden. It is located in Jönköping Municipality, Jönköping County, Sweden. The church is situated next to the lake Gårdsjön.

The church belongs to the Norra Mo Parish within the Diocese of Skara of the Church of Sweden. It was built in the late 17th century, replacing a medieval church demolished in May 1666. The new church was completed in May 1695. The church is built entirely of wood. South of the church stands a wooden bell tower built in 1686. The church has a sandstone baptismal font dating from the Middle Ages. The altarpiece was created in northern Germany in the early 17th century and the wood-carved pulpit with canopy dates from 1670. Between 1886 and 1890, the church underwent re-construction under the direction of architect Helgo Zettervall (1831–1907).
