= Jönköping (disambiguation) =

Jönköping can mean:

- Jönköping - a city in Sweden
- Jönköping Municipality - a municipality in Sweden
- Jönköping County - a county in Sweden
