= Johan Fredrik Åbom =

Swedish architect

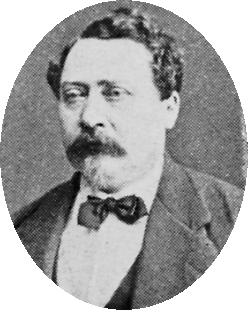
Johan Fredrik Åbom (1901)

Johan Fredrik Åbom (30 July 1817 - April 20, 1900) was a Swedish architect.

== Biography ==
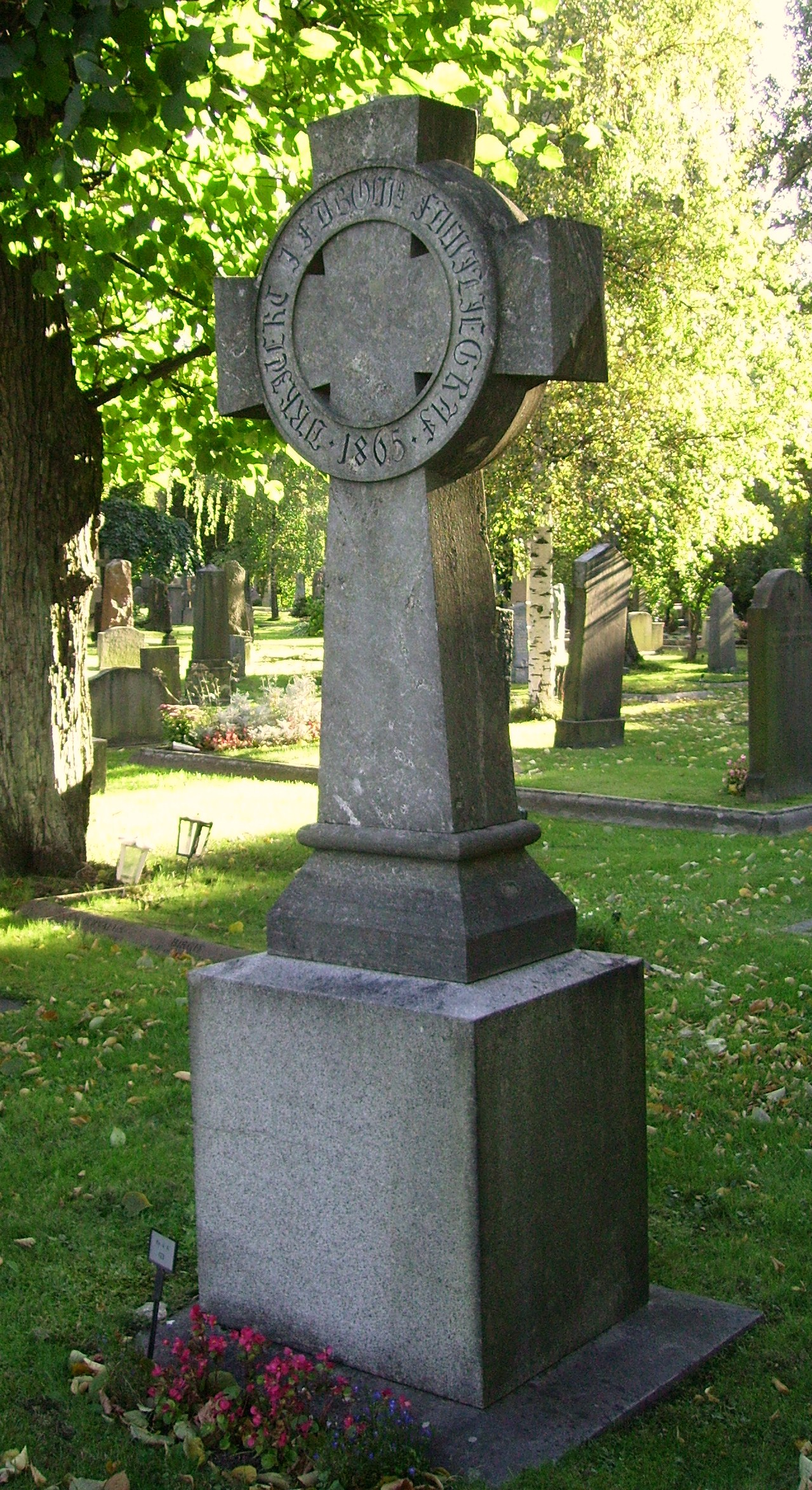
Johan Fredrik Åbom grave

Åbom was born in the parish of Katarina in Stockholm County, Sweden. He was a student at the Royal Swedish Academy of Fine Arts in Stockholm at the same time as Fredrik Wilhelm Scholander (1816–1881). Prior to this, he was a bricklayer apprentice and student at the KTH Royal Institute of Technology in Stockholm. Apart from a short study tour to Germany in 1852, he followed the traditional timeline for scientific publication.

After the Royal Art Academy and until 1882, he was working at the Swedish government administration of state buildings (Överintendentsämbetet). During the years 1843–1853, he was working as an architect for prison management. He had the entire country as sphere of activity, with both public - and private assignments. He designed manor houses, banks, hotels, factories, hospitals, town halls, churches and theatres. In 1848 he was one of the founders of the Stockholm building association (Stockholms byggnadsförening). The association was established for the exchange of information and establishment of personal contacts within the trade trades.

Johan Fredrik Åbom was from 1857 one of the first to design stoves for the porcelain manufacturer Rörstrands porslinsfabrik.

Among the many restaurant and theatre buildings he designed were Södra Teatern built at Mosebacke square in Södermalm during 1852 and Berns salonger, a musical cabaret restaurant built in Stockholm during 1862 for restaurateur Heinrich Robert Berns (1815-1902).

Johan Fredrik Åbom also designed Boo Castle (Boo slott), a manor house constructed 1878–1882 in Gothic Revival on an estate at Lilla Nygatan in Gamla Stan in Stockholm.

== Selected works ==
- Ausås Kyrka
- Fjällskäfte slott
- Gamla riksdagshuset
- Hälleforsnäs Bruk
- Kesätter slott
- Linköpings stadshus
- Fastigheten Midas 7, Mälartorget 13, Gamla stan
- Södra teatern
- Stockholms Enskilda Bank i Gamla stan
- Hotel Rydberg
- Residenset i Jönköping
- Residenset i Karlstad
- Stigbergets sjukhus vid Fjällgatan i Stockholm
- Stora Sällskapet
- Tanto sockerbruk
- Gröna gården
- Stockholms Nation, Uppsala, 1848
- Katarina västra skola 1856
- Maria folkskola, 1864
- Lösens kyrka,1858–60
- Kristine kyrka, Falun, 1864
- Bankeryds kyrka, 1865
- Utsiktstornet på Jacobsberg, 1865–67
- Gymnastikbyggnaden i Jönköping, 1878–81
- Västerviks läroverk (Ellen Key-skolan)
- Fänneslunda-Grovare kyrka, 1874

== Image Gallery ==
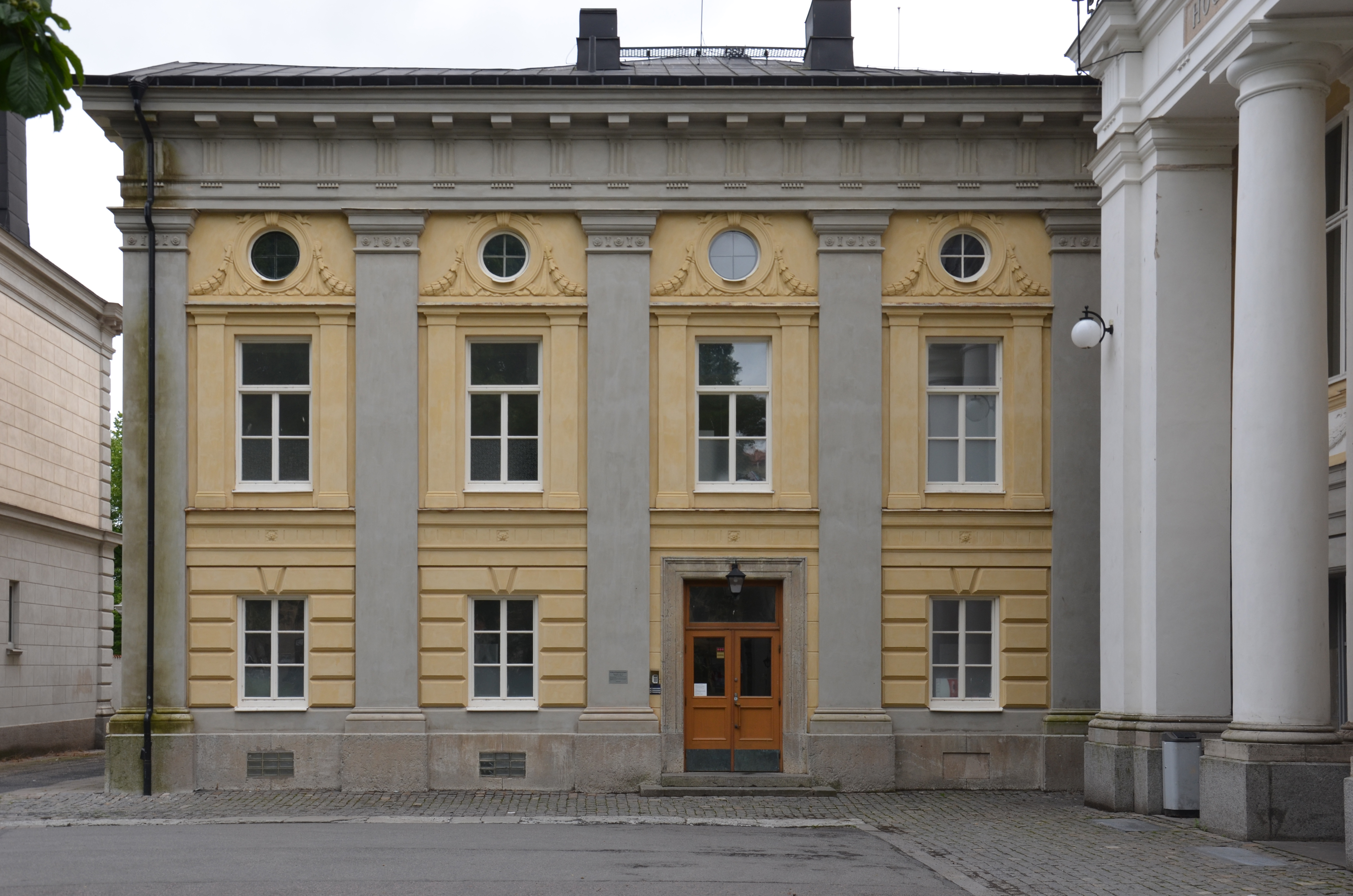
Gymnastics Building, Jönköping (1878-81)

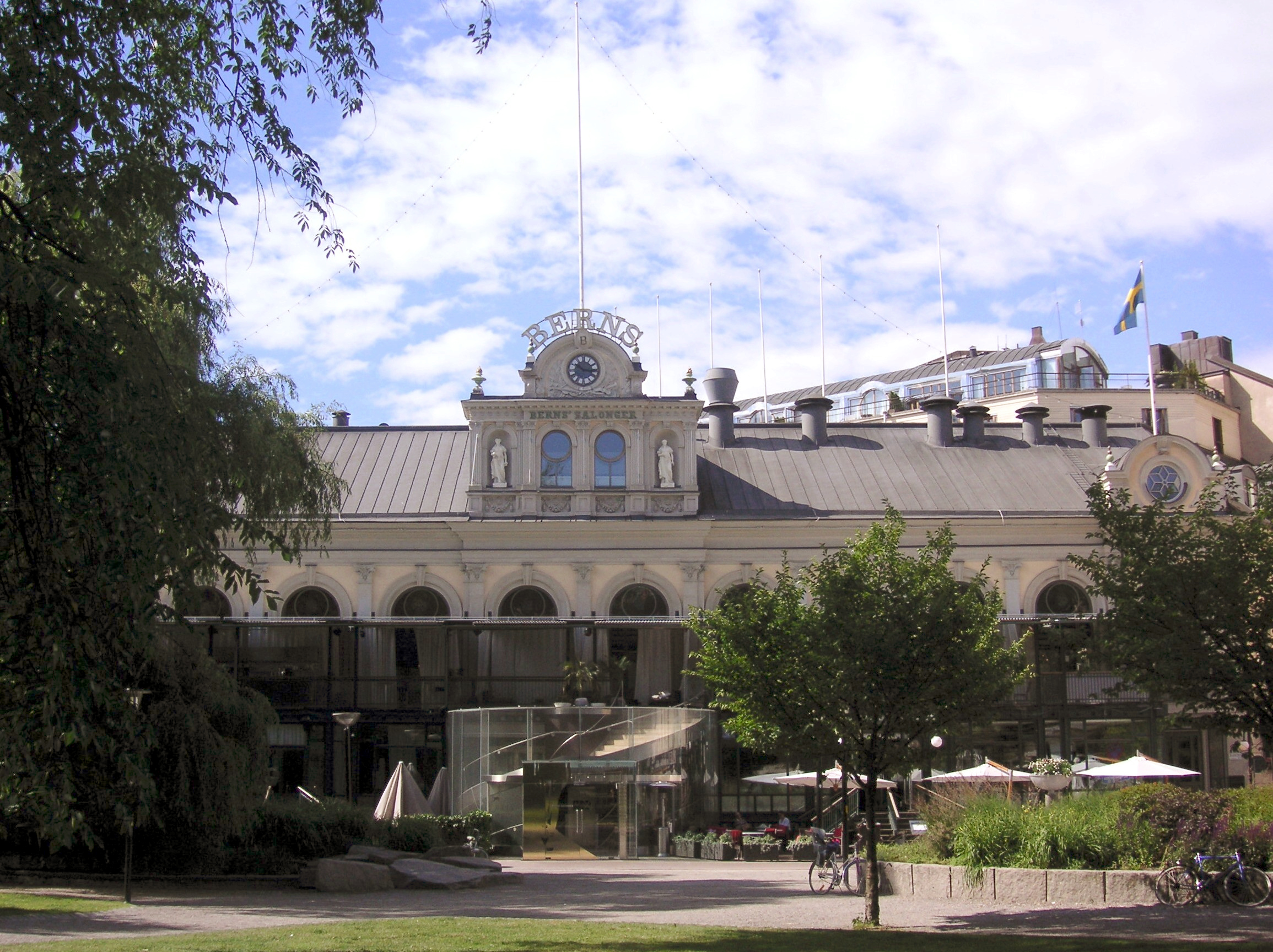
Berns Salonger, Stockholm (1862)

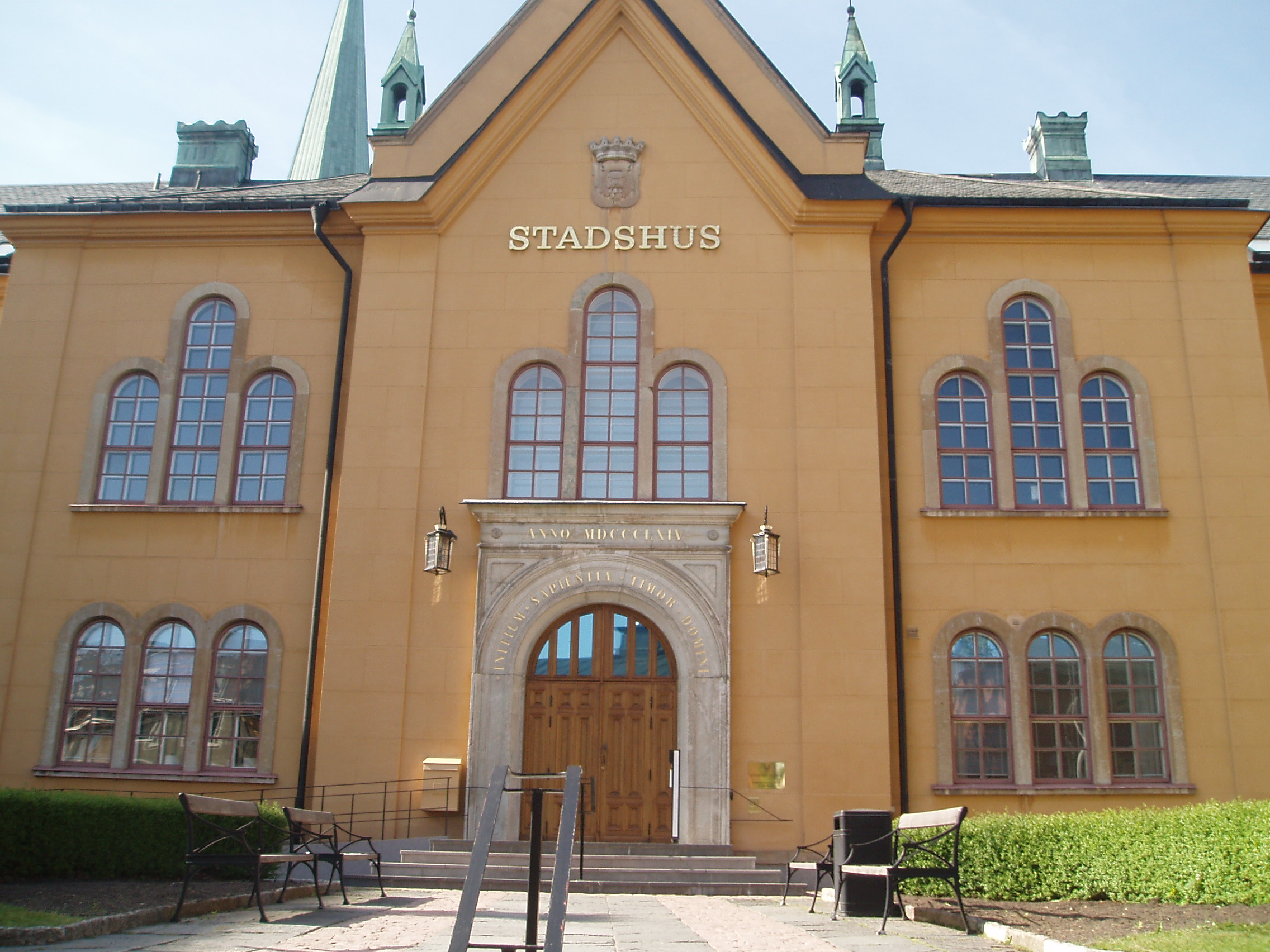
Linköping City Hall, Linköping (1864)

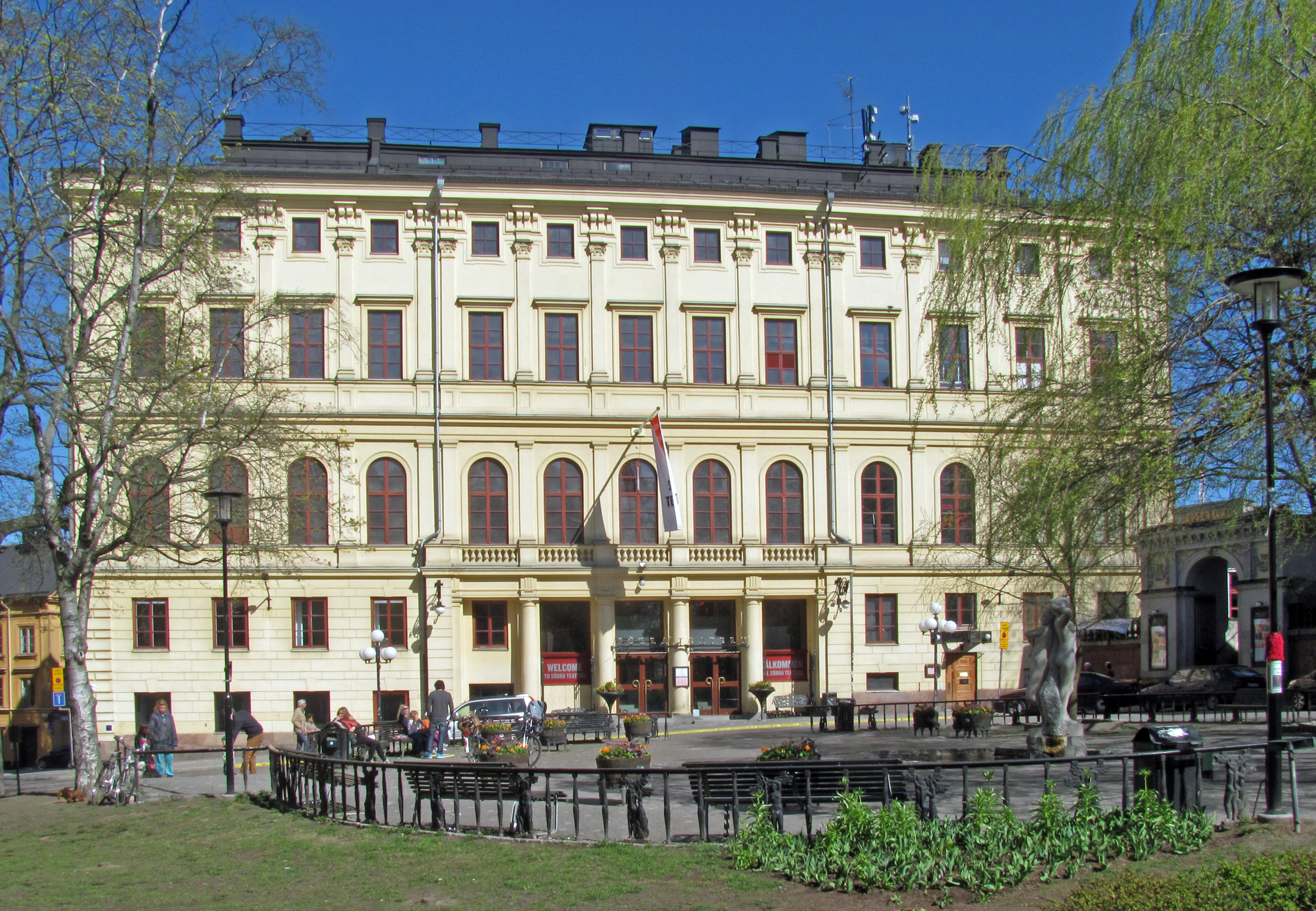
Södra teatern, Stockholm (1852)

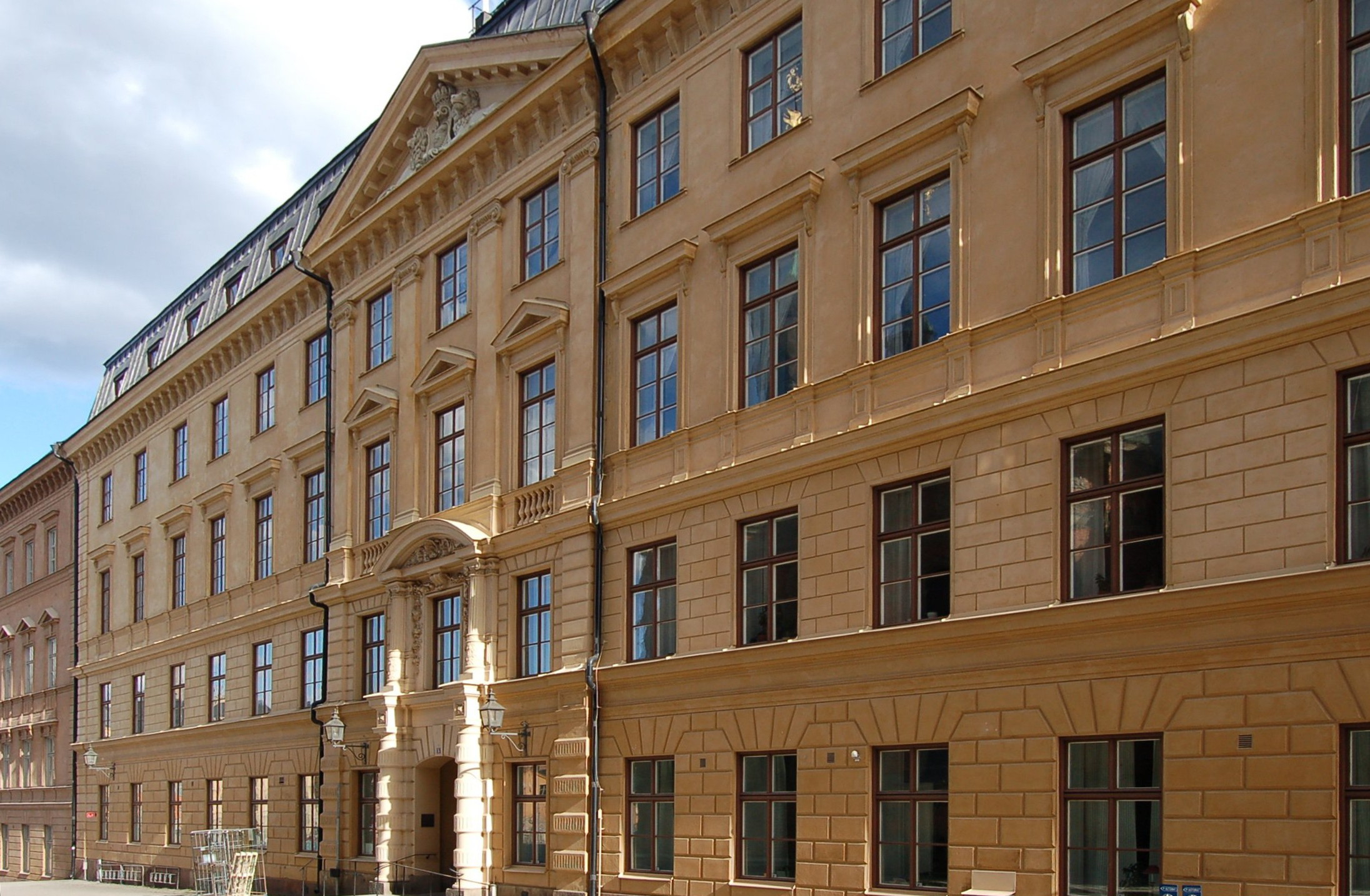
Riksdagshuset, Stockholm (1897–1905)

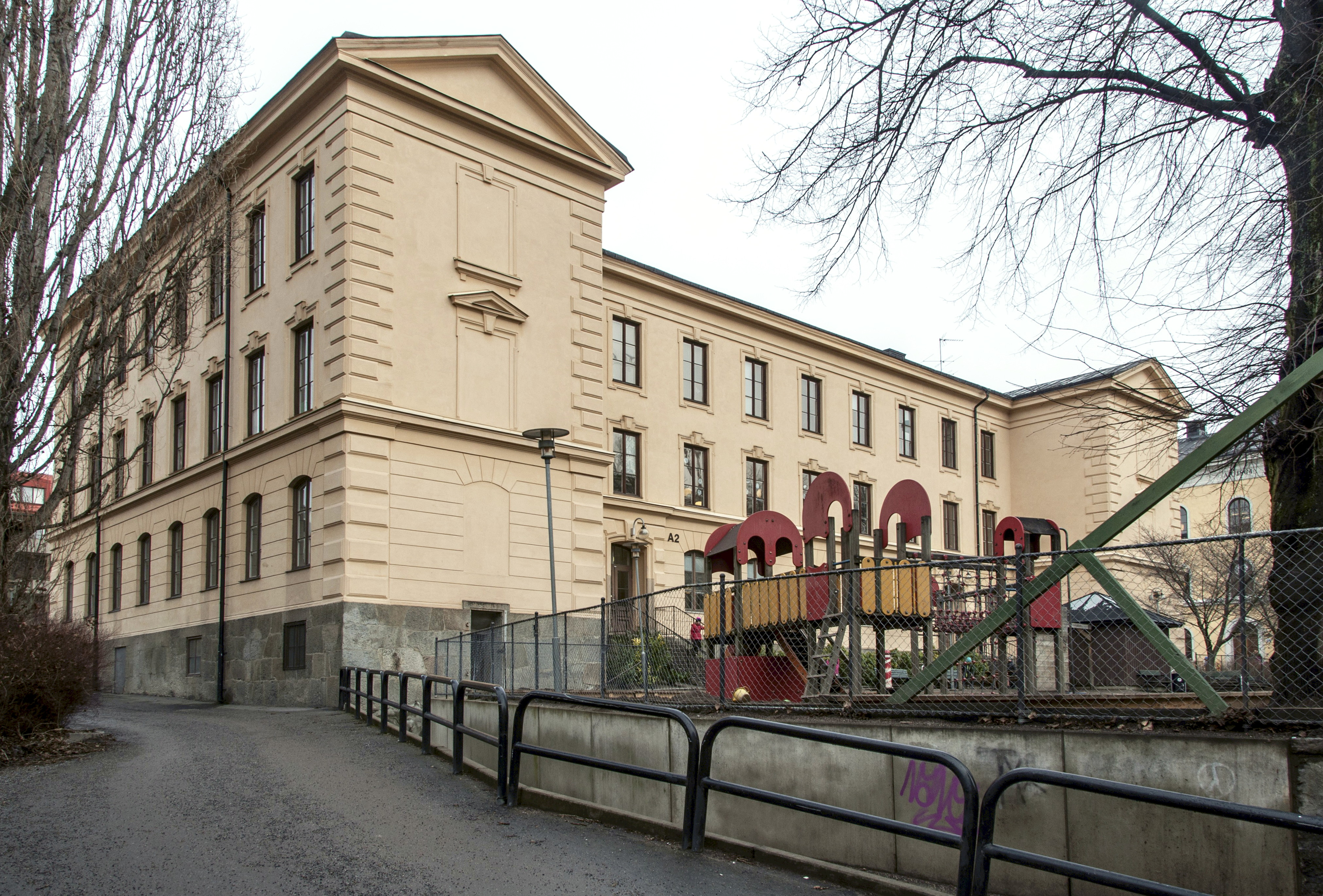
Maria gamla skola, Stockholm (1864 and 1876)

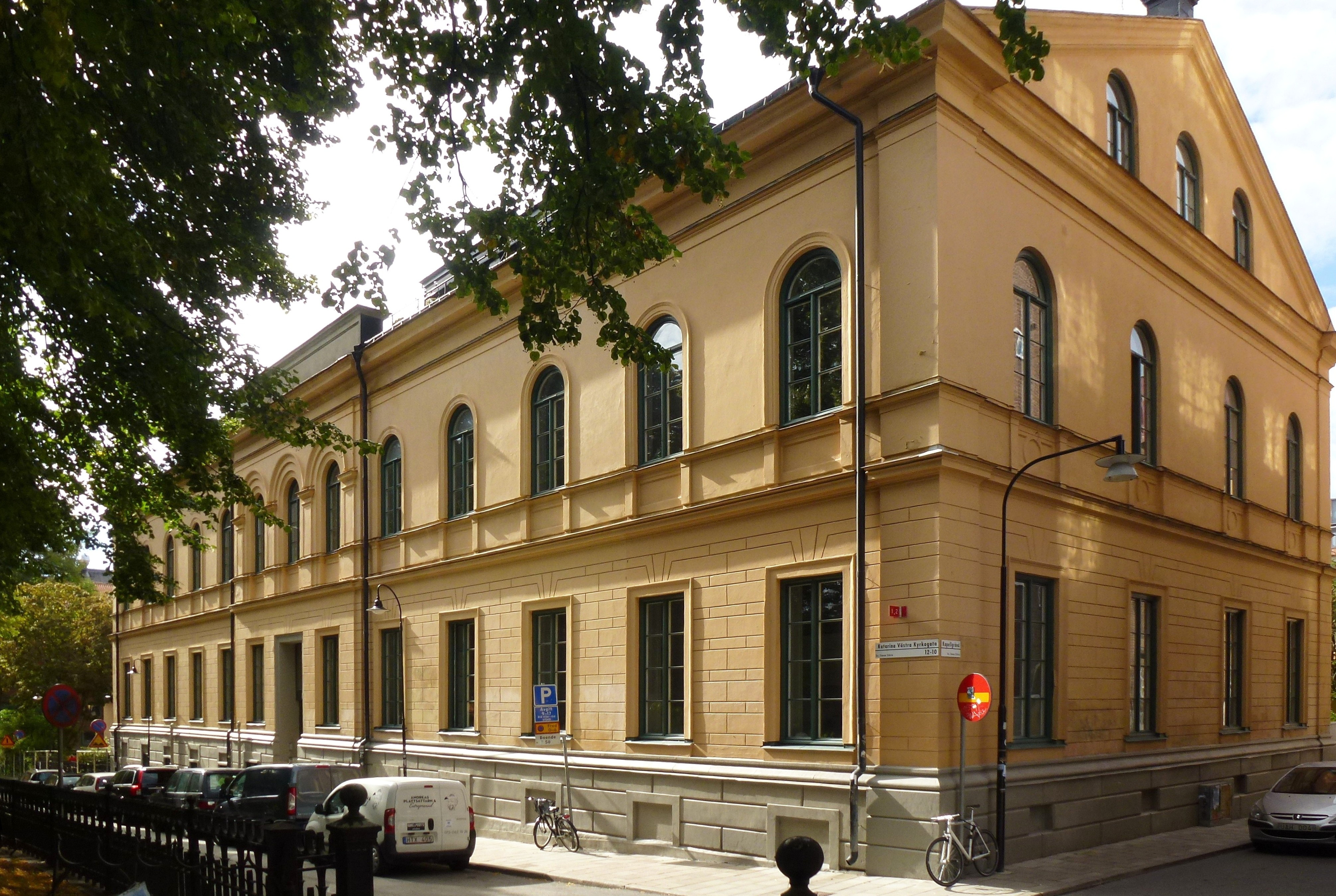
Katarina västra skola, Stockholm (1856)

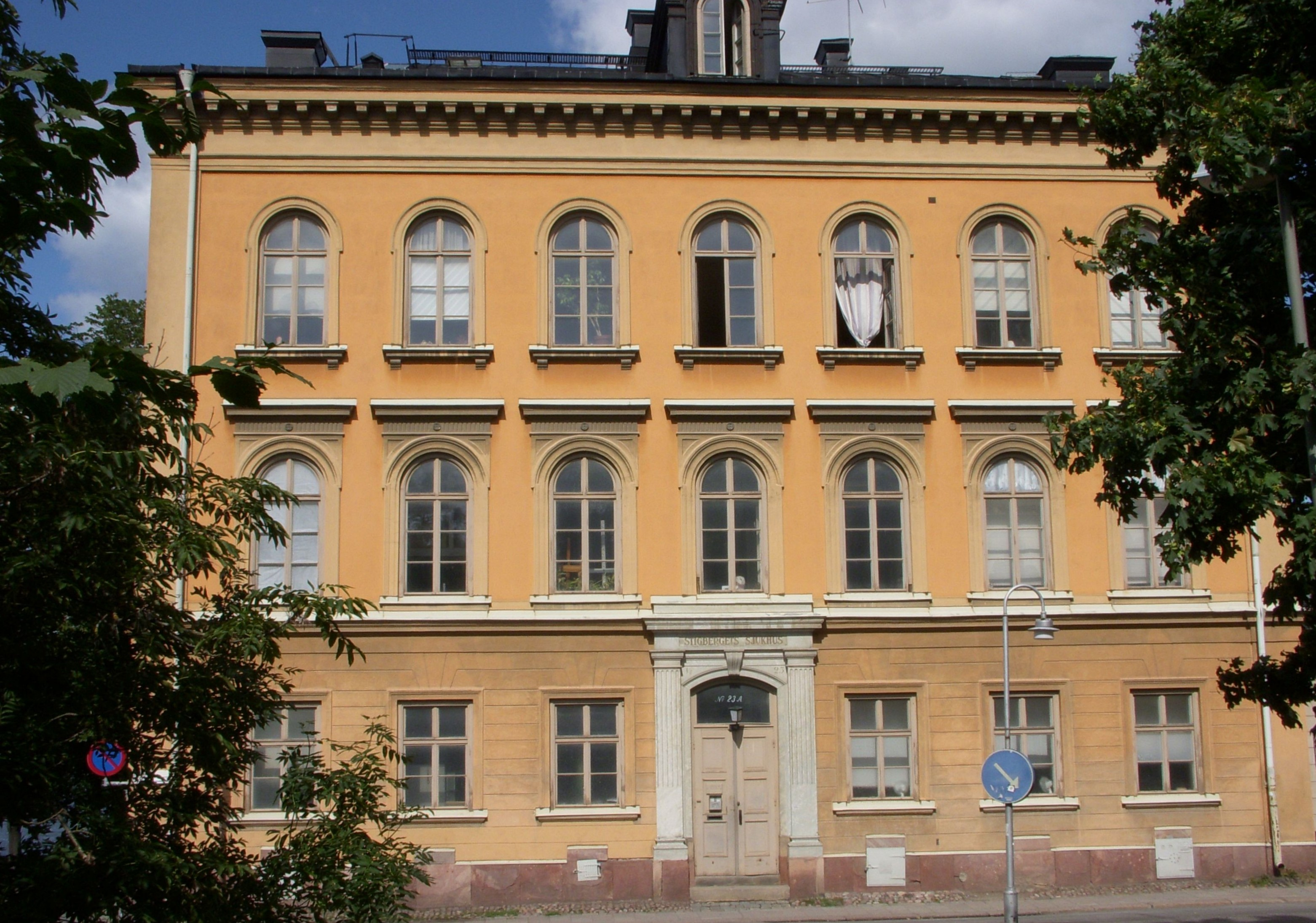
Stigbergets sjukhus, Stockholm (1861)

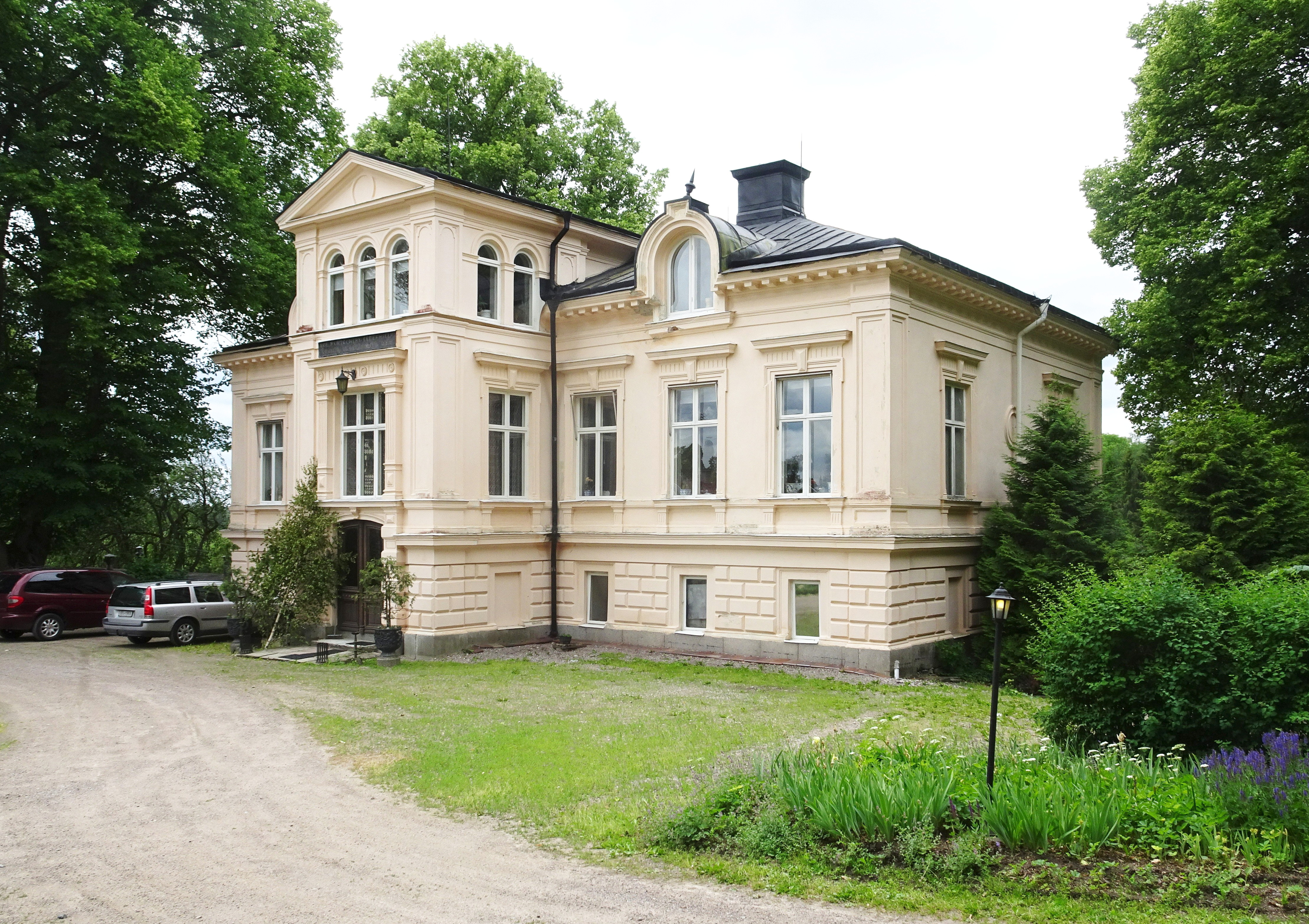
Lindholmens gård, Vallentuna (1884)
