= Norrahammar Church =

Coordinates: 57.7046°N 14.1173°E

- Norrahammars kyrka
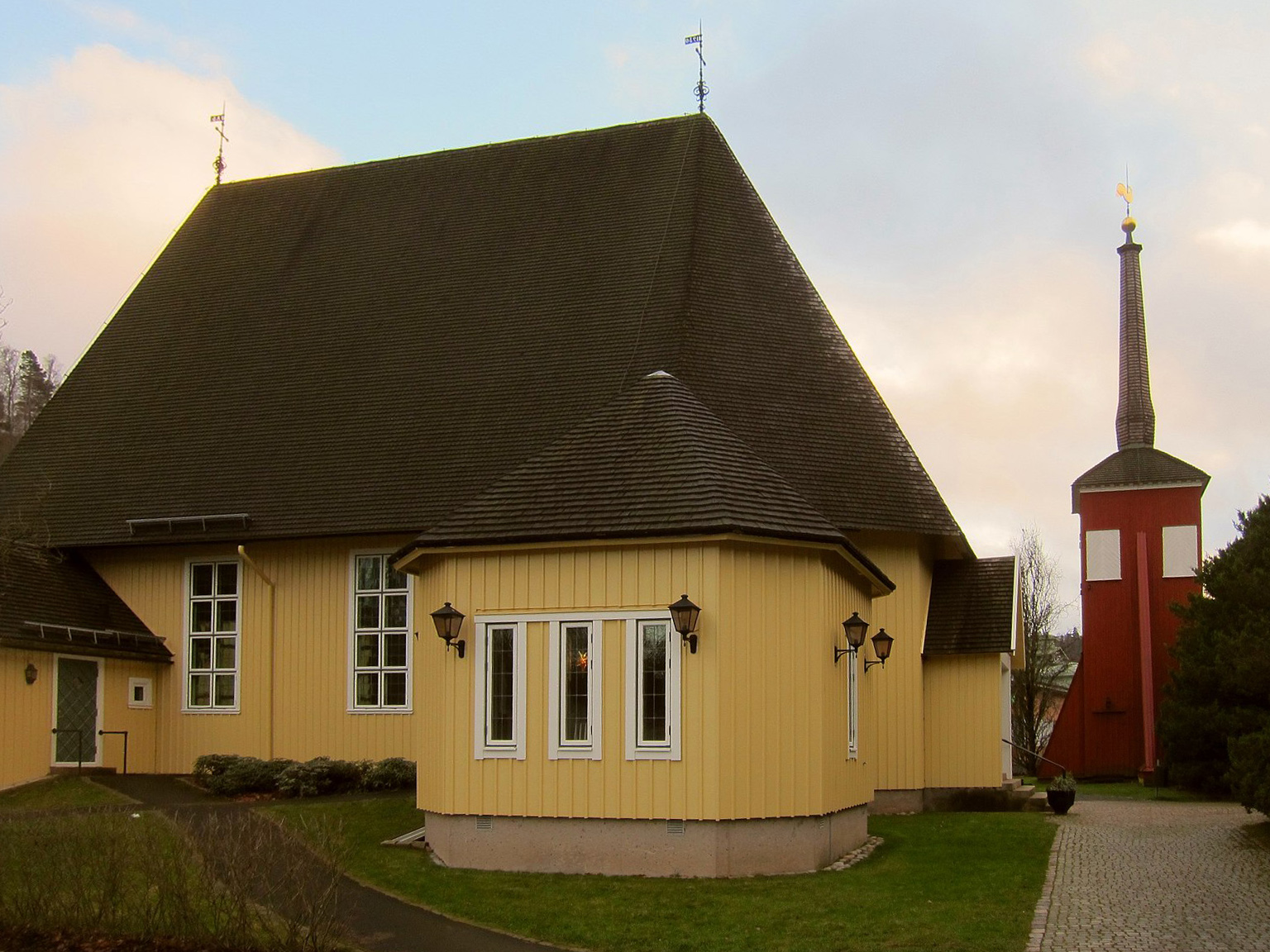
- Norrahammar Church in December 2014
- Norrahammar Church
- Location: Norrahammar
- Country: Sweden
- Denomination: Church of Sweden

History
- Consecrated: 1930

Administration
- Diocese: Växjö
- Parish: Norrahammar

Norrahammar Church (Swedish: Norrahammars kyrka) is a church building in Norrahammar in Sweden. It belongs to Norrahammar Parish of the Church of Sweden. Opened in 1930, it was originally a chapel.
