= Bankeryd =

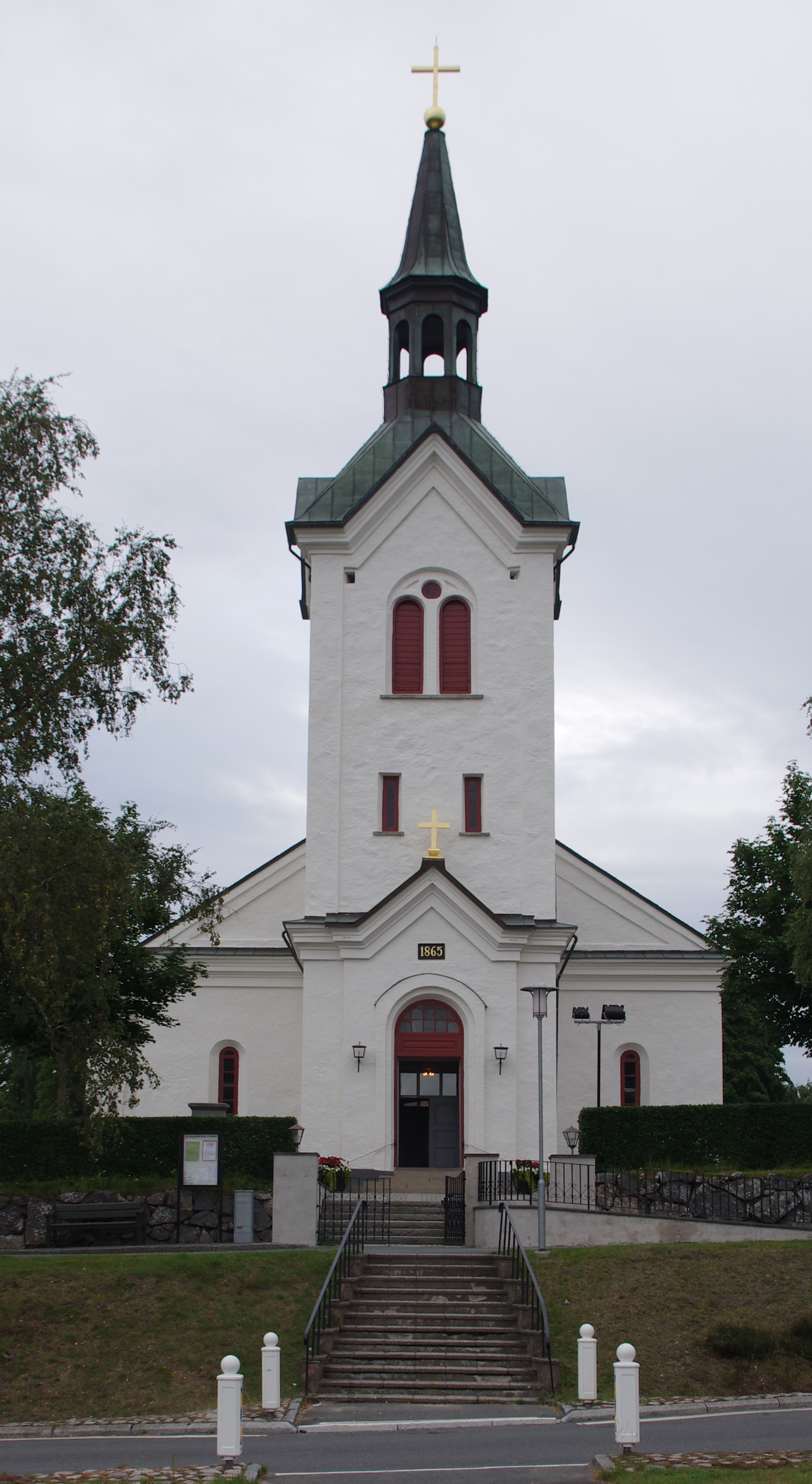
- Bankeryd Church

- Location within Jönköping Location within Sweden
- Coordinates: 57°51′N 14°07′E
- Country: Sweden
- Province: Småland
- County: Jönköping County
- Municipality: Jönköping Municipality

Area
  - Total: 5.39 km^{2} (2.08 sq mi)

Population (31 December 2010)
  - Total: 8,107
  - Density: 1,503/km^{2} (3,890/sq mi)
- Time zone: UTC+1 (CET)
  - Summer (DST): UTC+2 (CEST)
- Climate: Dfb

Bankeryd is the second largest locality situated in Jönköping Municipality, Jönköping County, Sweden with 8,107 inhabitants in 2010.

Bankeryd is situated on the western shore of the lake Vättern about 7 km north of the municipal city Jönköping. It is mainly residential with some industries, and could be considered a suburb of Jönköping.
