= Kaxholmen =

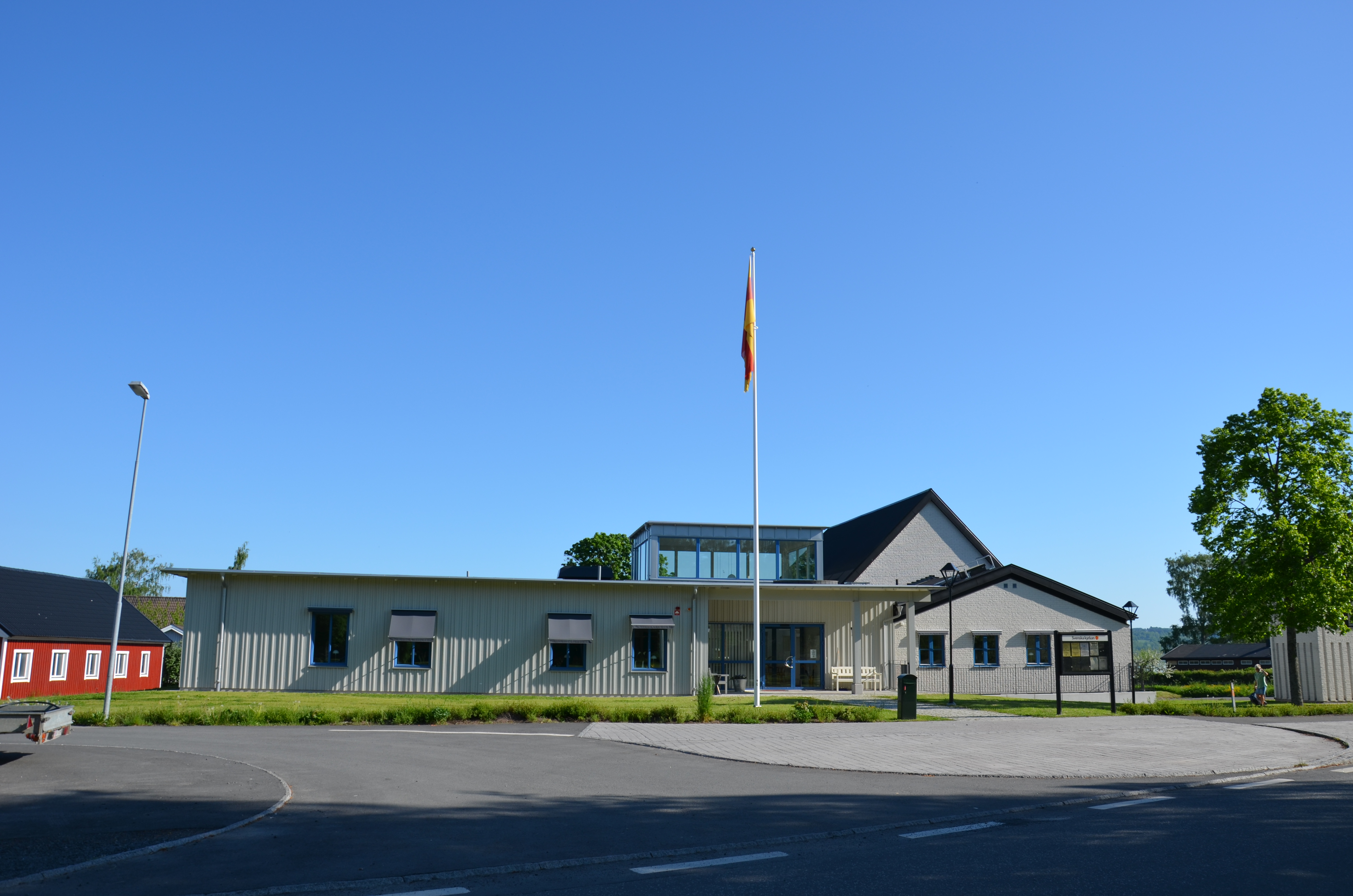
- Landsjö Church in May 2012

- Location within Jönköping Location within Sweden
- Coordinates: 57°52′N 14°18′E
- Country: Sweden
- Province: Småland
- County: Jönköping County
- Municipality: Jönköping Municipality

Area
  - Total: 0.87 km^{2} (0.34 sq mi)

Population (31 December 2010)
  - Total: 1,458
  - Density: 1,668/km^{2} (4,320/sq mi)
- Time zone: UTC+1 (CET)
  - Summer (DST): UTC+2 (CEST)
- Climate: Dfb

Kaxholmen is a locality situated in Jönköping Municipality, Jönköping County, Sweden with 1,458 inhabitants in 2010. The small locality is located near the lake of Landsjön which is well known for its bird-habitats.
