= Lekeryd =

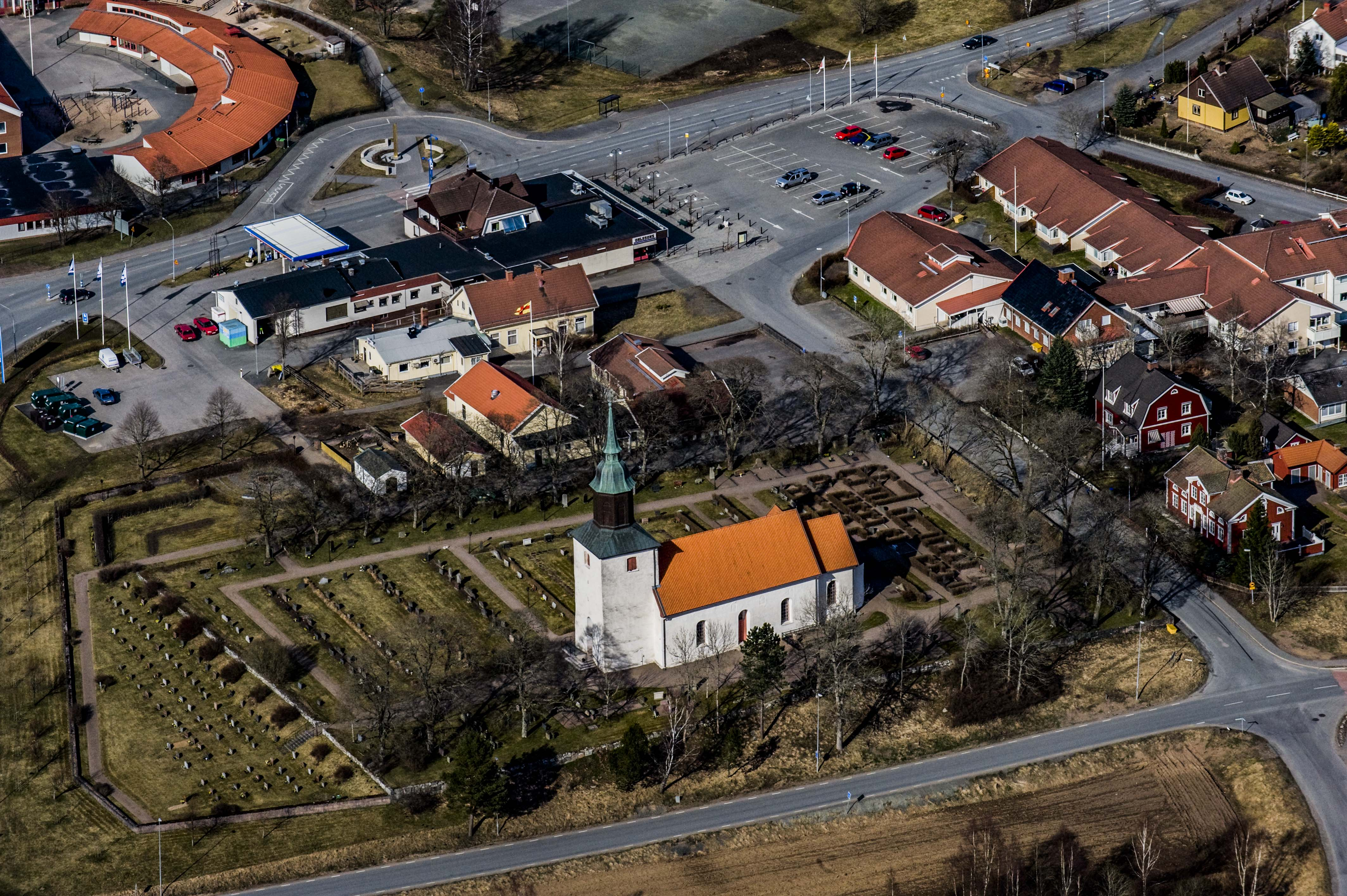
- Lekeryd Church

- Location within Jönköping Location within Sweden
- Coordinates: 57°46′N 14°24′E
- Country: Sweden
- Province: Småland
- County: Jönköping County
- Municipality: Jönköping Municipality

Area
  - Total: 0.70 km^{2} (0.27 sq mi)

Population (31 December 2010)
  - Total: 817
  - Density: 1,168/km^{2} (3,030/sq mi)
- Time zone: UTC+1 (CET)
  - Summer (DST): UTC+2 (CEST)
- Climate: Dfb

Lekeryd is a locality situated in Jönköping Municipality, Jönköping County, Sweden with 817 inhabitants in 2010.
