= Odensjö =

- Location within Jönköping Location within Sweden
- Coordinates: 57°43′N 14°10′E
- Country: Sweden
- Province: Småland
- County: Jönköping County
- Municipality: Jönköping Municipality

Area
  - Total: 1.82 km^{2} (0.70 sq mi)

Population (31 December 2010)
  - Total: 2,495
  - Density: 1,370/km^{2} (3,500/sq mi)
- Time zone: UTC+1 (CET)
  - Summer (DST): UTC+2 (CEST)
- Climate: Dfb

Odensjö is a locality situated in Jönköping Municipality, Jönköping County, Sweden with 2,495 inhabitants in 2010.
