= Öggestorp =

- Location within Jönköping Location within Sweden
- Coordinates: 57°44′N 14°23′E
- Country: Sweden
- Province: Småland
- County: Jönköping County
- Municipality: Jönköping Municipality

Area
  - Total: 0.31 km^{2} (0.12 sq mi)

Population (31 December 2010)
  - Total: 212
  - Density: 688/km^{2} (1,780/sq mi)
- Time zone: UTC+1 (CET)
  - Summer (DST): UTC+2 (CEST)
- Climate: Dfb

Öggestorp is a locality situated in Jönköping Municipality, Jönköping County, Sweden with 212 inhabitants in 2010.

== Notable people from Öggestorp ==
- Acko Ankarberg Johansson

== See also ==
- Öggestorp Church
