= Barnarp Church =

Coordinates: 57.7086°N 14.1789°E

- Barnarps kyrka
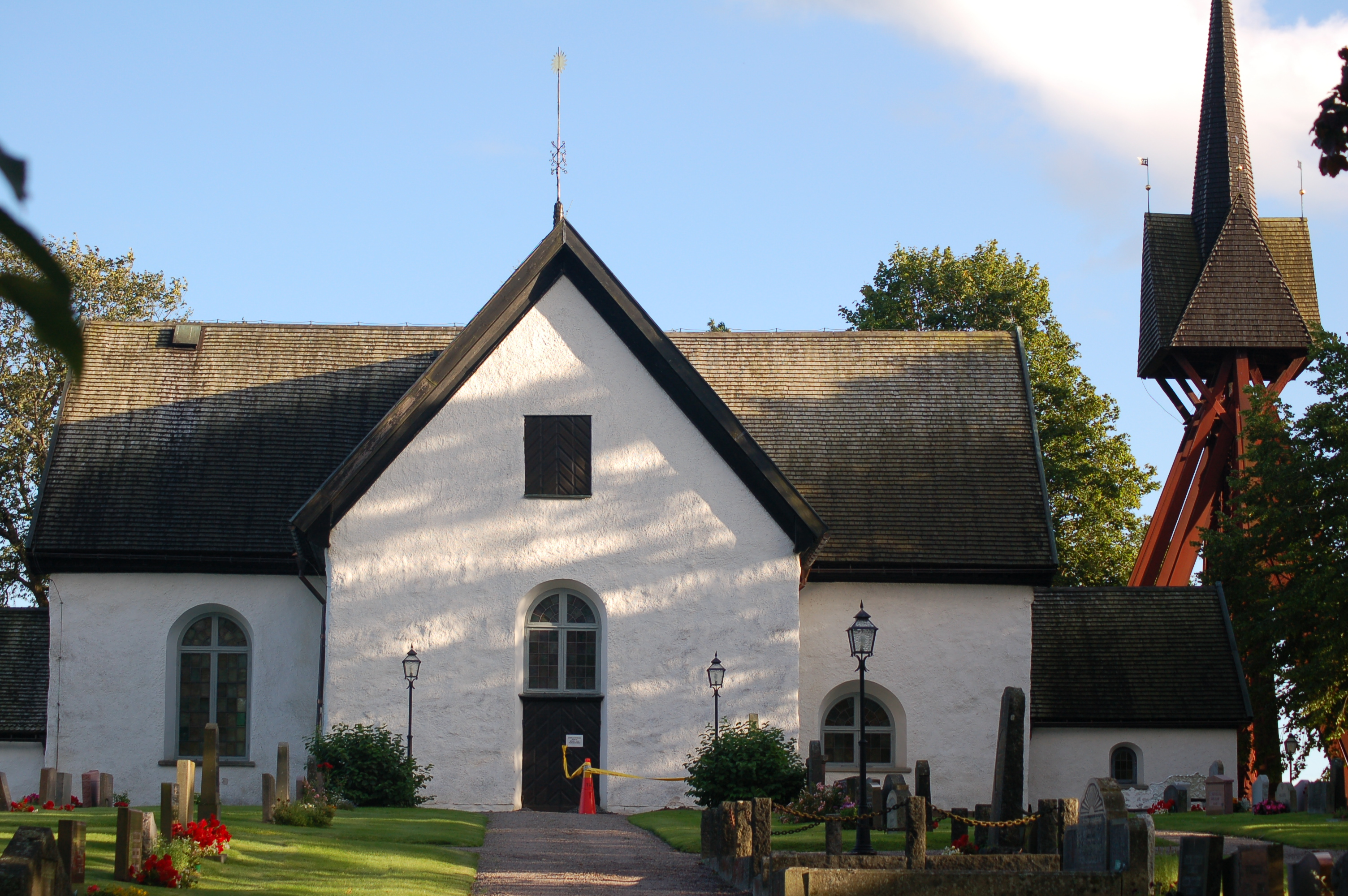
- Barnarp Church in August 2008
- Barnarp Church
- Location: Barnarp
- Country: Sweden
- Denomination: Church of Sweden

Administration
- Diocese: Växjö
- Parish: Barnarp

Barnarp Church (Swedish: Barnarps kyrka) is a church building at Barnarp in Jönköping County, Sweden. It belongs to the Barnarp Parish of the Diocese of Växjö in the Church of Sweden.

The oldest part of the church dates to the 13th century. It was built in Romanesque architectural style. The current floor plan is in the shape of a Greek cross following the addition of the two transepts in 1686–87. The interior of the church dates to the late 17th century and the mid-18th century and is decorated in the Baroque style. In 1730, the wooden ceilings are illustrated with biblical scenes by the artist Johann Kinnerus (1705-1759).
