= Landsjö Church =

Coordinates: 57.8589°N 14.3074°E

- Landsjökyrkan
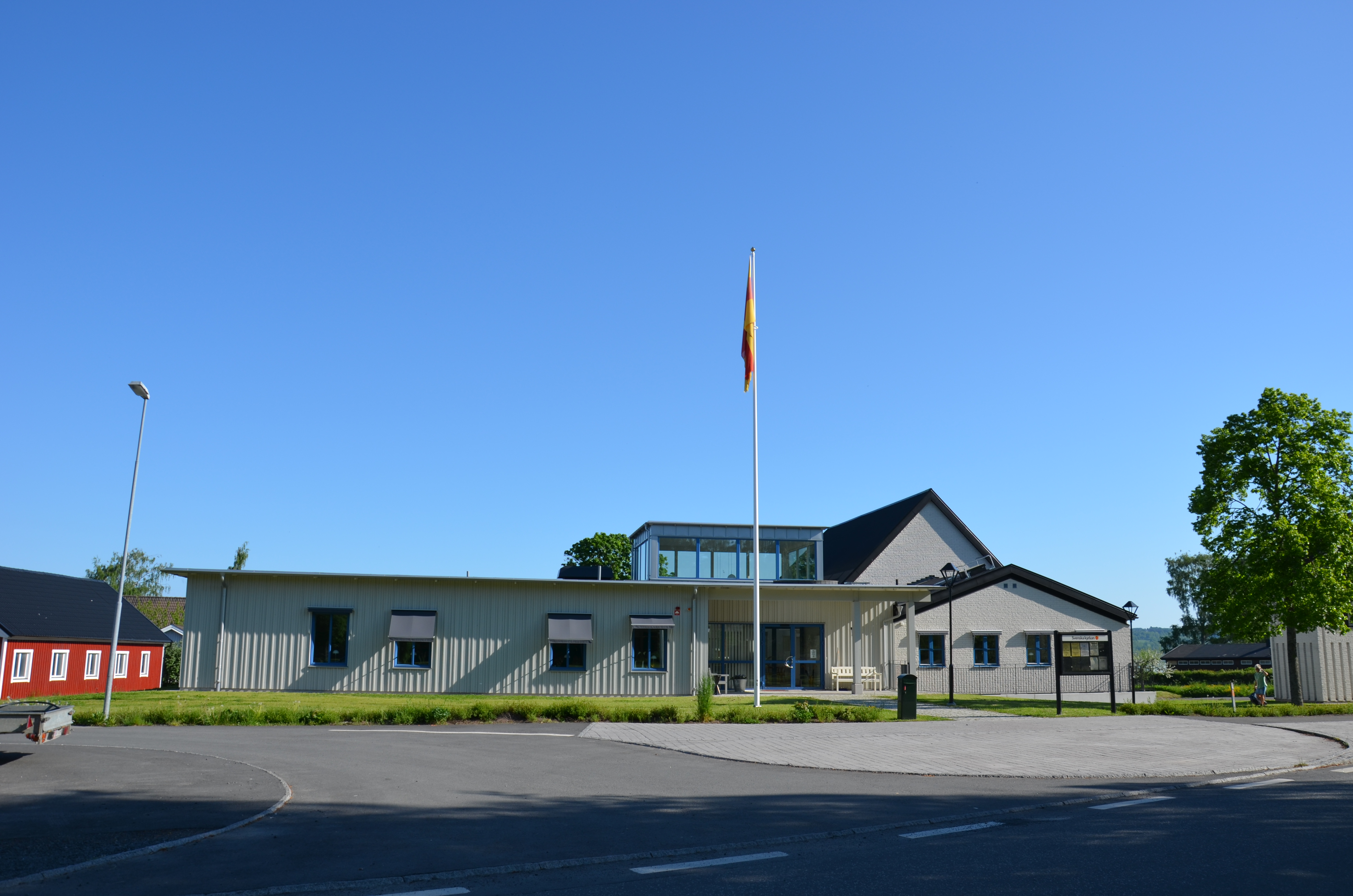
- Landsjö Church in May 2012
- Landsjö Church
- Location: Kaxholmen
- Country: Sweden
- Denomination: Church of Sweden

History
- Consecrated: 1984

Administration
- Diocese: Växjö
- Parish: Skärstad-Ölmstad

Landsjö Church (Swedish: Landsjökyrkan) is a church building in Kaxholmen in Sweden. Belonging to the Skärstad-Ölmstad Parish of the Church of Sweden, it was inaugurated in 1984.
