= Öggestorp Church =

Coordinates: 57.7253°N 14.3844°E

- Öggestorps kyrka
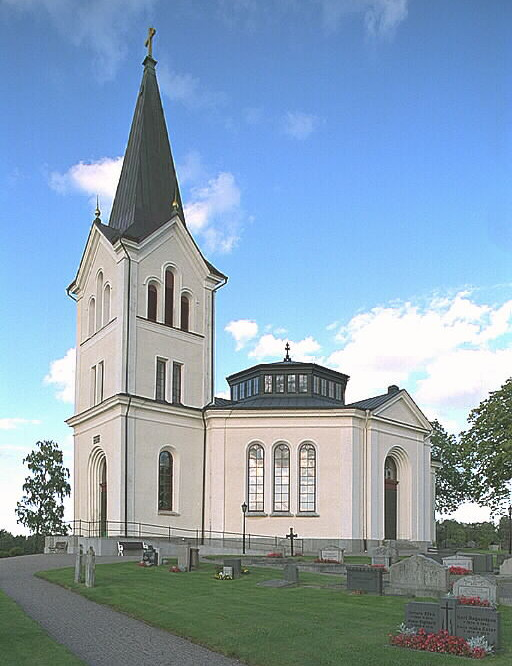
- Öggestorp Church in July 2010
- Öggestorp Church
- Location: Öggestorp
- Country: Sweden
- Denomination: Church of Sweden

Administration
- Diocese: Växjö
- Parish: Rogberga-Öggestorp

Öggestorp Church (Swedish: Öggestorps kyrka) is a church building in Öggestorp, Sweden. It belongs to the Rogberga-Öggestorp Parish within the Diocese of Växjö in the Church of Sweden. The church was opened on 18 August 1883 replacing the old church, which was demolished in 1882. Over the years, the church has undergone several renovations, the last during 1996–1997. The pulpit was carved in 1681. The altarpiece is probably a work from the mid-18th century. The sandstone baptismal font dates to the medieval era.
