= Barnarp =

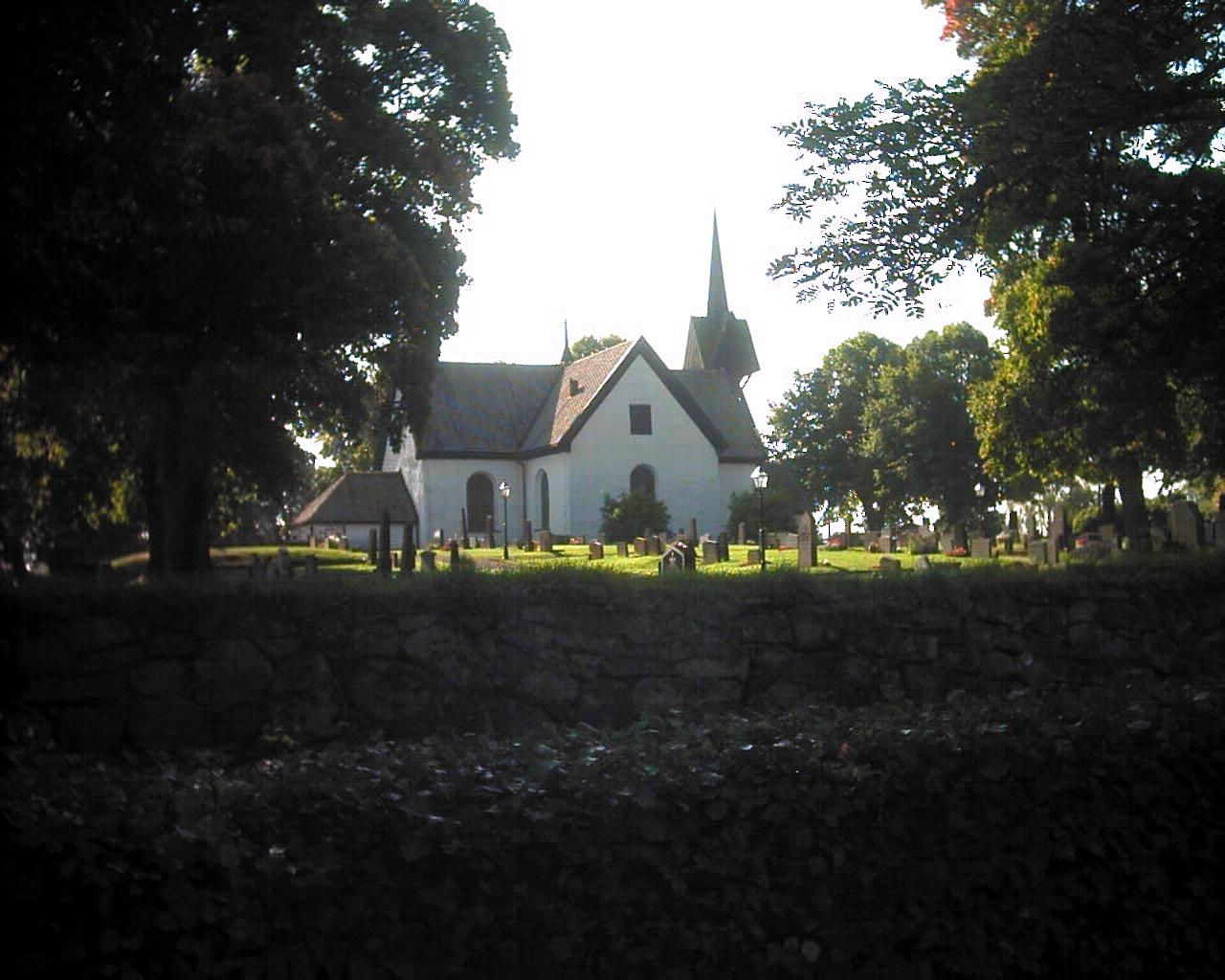
- Barnarp Church

- Location within Jönköping Location within Sweden
- Coordinates: 57°42′N 14°11′E
- Country: Sweden
- Province: Småland
- County: Jönköping County
- Municipality: Jönköping Municipality

Area
  - Total: 0.67 km^{2} (0.26 sq mi)

Population (31 December 2005)
  - Total: 724
  - Density: 1,088/km^{2} (2,820/sq mi)
- Time zone: UTC+1 (CET)
  - Summer (DST): UTC+2 (CEST)

Barnarp is a village situated in Jönköping Municipality, Jönköping County, Sweden with 724 inhabitants in 2005.

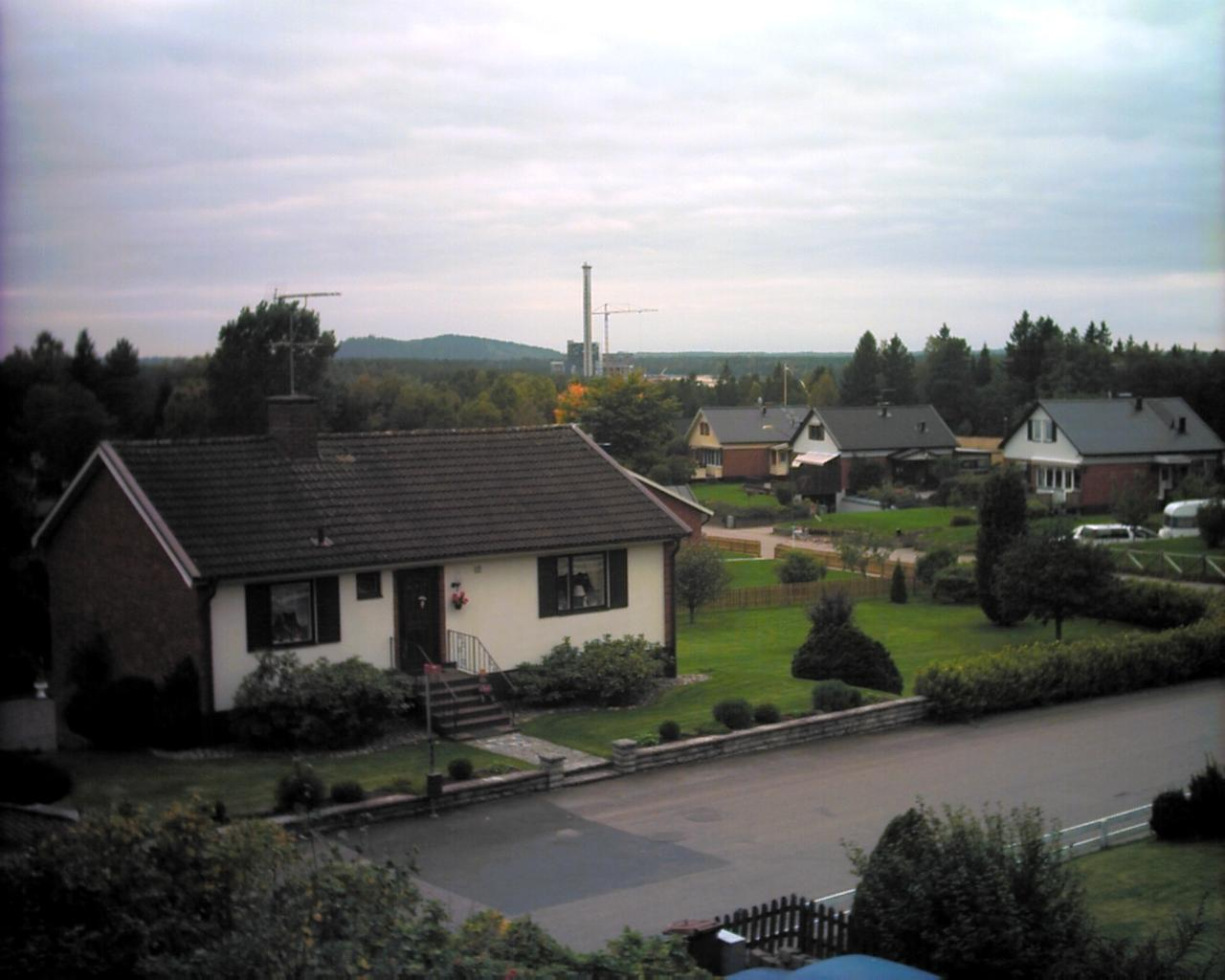
Houses in Barnarp

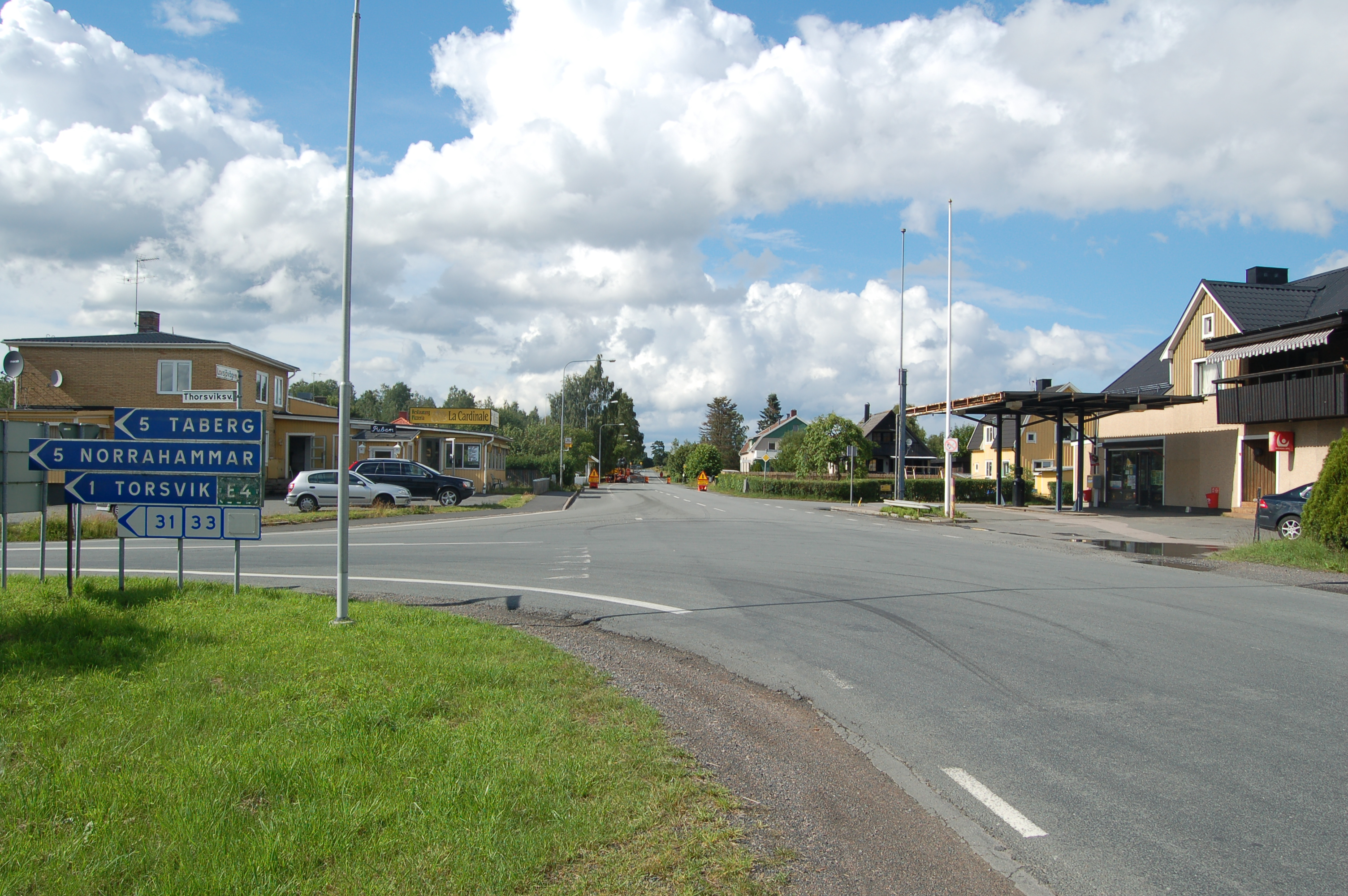
