= Trånghalla =

Swedish village in Jönköping County

- Location within Jönköping Location within Sweden
- Coordinates: 57°50′N 14°09′E
- Country: Sweden
- Province: Småland
- County: Jönköping County
- Municipality: Jönköping Municipality

Area
  - Total: 1.08 km^{2} (0.42 sq mi)

Population (2005-12-31)
  - Total: 1,251
  - Density: 1,154/km^{2} (2,990/sq mi)
- Time zone: UTC+1 (CET)
  - Summer (DST): UTC+2 (CEST)

Trånghalla is a village situated in Jönköping Municipality, Jönköping County, Sweden with 1,251 inhabitants as of 2005. It is the location of the Trånghalla Church.
