= Trånghalla Church =

Coordinates: 57.8413°N 14.1484°E

- Trånghalla kyrka
- Trånghalla Church
- Location: Trånghalla
- Country: Sweden
- Denomination: Church of Sweden

History
- Consecrated: 1969

Administration
- Diocese: Växjö
- Parish: Bankeryd

Trånghalla Church (Swedish: Trånghalla kyrka) is a church building in Trånghalla in Sweden. Belonging to the Bankeryd Parish of the Church of Sweden, the church was opened in 1969.
