= Bottnaryd =

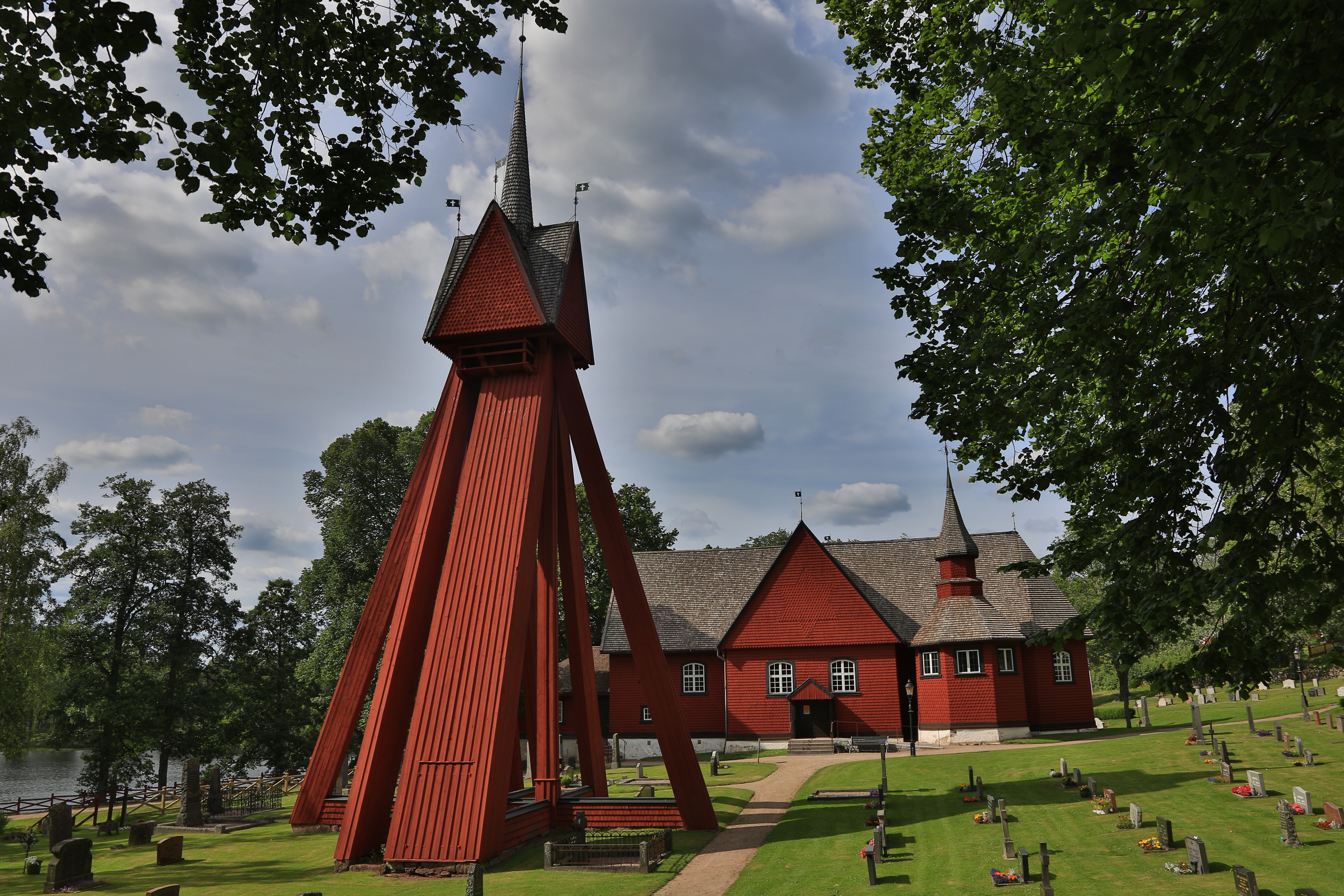
- Bottnaryd Church in July 2014

- Location within Jönköping Location within Sweden
- Coordinates: 57°46′N 13°49′E
- Country: Sweden
- Province: Småland
- County: Jönköping County
- Municipality: Jönköping Municipality

Area
  - Total: 0.83 km^{2} (0.32 sq mi)

Population (31 December 2010)
  - Total: 713
  - Density: 856/km^{2} (2,220/sq mi)
- Time zone: UTC+1 (CET)
  - Summer (DST): UTC+2 (CEST)
- Climate: Dfb

Bottnaryd is a locality situated in Jönköping Municipality, Jönköping County, Sweden with 713 inhabitants in 2010.
