= Boo Castle =

Castle in Sweden

- Hallsberg Municipality, Sweden
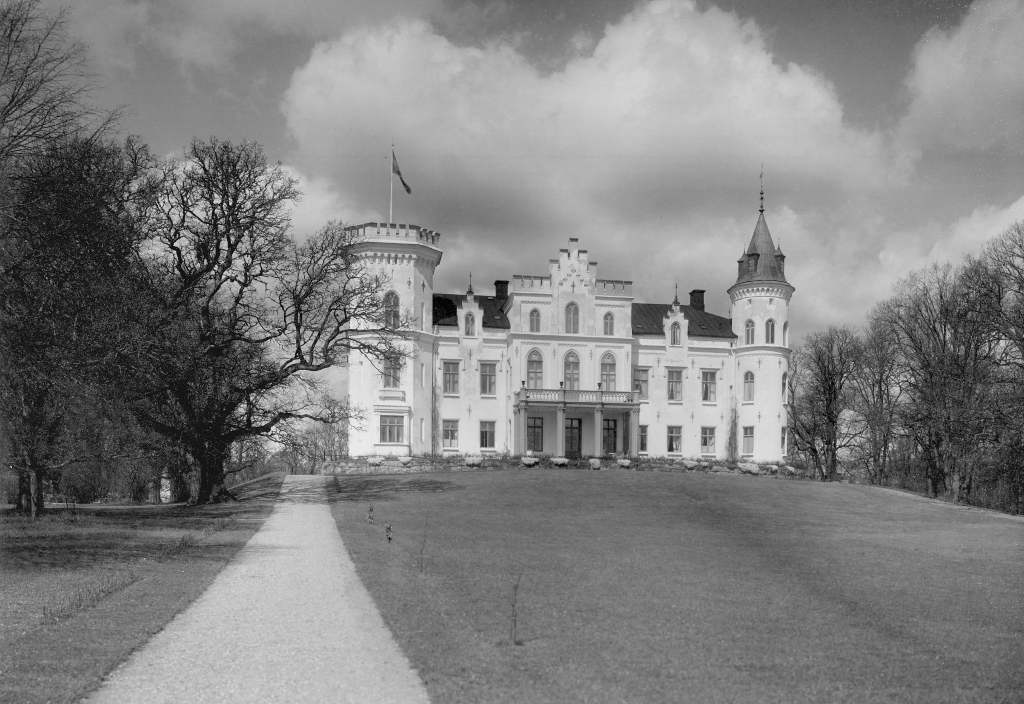

Site information
- Type: Castle

Location
- Coordinates: 58°55′32.70″N 15°31′11.57″E

Boo Castle (Swedish: Boo slott) is a castle in Hallsberg Municipality, Örebro County, Sweden.

== History ==
Upon the death of Baron Gustaf Kruus and his sister Anna in 1692, the land surrounding Boo was inherited by the daughter of Anna Kruus and her husband Baron Claes Hermansson Fleming af Liebelitz, Anna Flemming (1683–1737). Anna went on to marry Baron Hugo Johan Hamilton, a Swedish military officer, in 1723. Hamilton laid the foundations of the "fideikommiss" of Boo Estate (from the Latin fideicommissum, which is a Swedish legal structure for the inheritance of great estates, which means the estate does not have to be split evenly between the heirs, but the entirety can be inherited by one heir), which is still in place today, and one of the few remaining in Sweden.

Since Hugo Johan Hamilton, Boo Estate has remained in ownership of the Swedish barony Hamilton af Hageby.

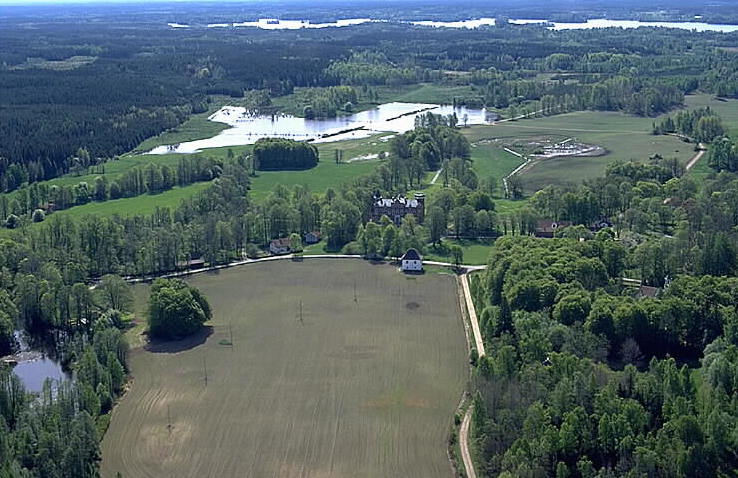

== Architecture ==
The initial Manor House in Boo was built in the "karoliner" style, typical of manors in the 17th and 18th centuries in Sweden. The house was redesigned for the first time in the 1780s under Karl Didrik Hamilton, who repurposed the house to a corps de logi. In 1878 the old Manor House was torn down to make room for the current castle. The castle was designed by the famous Swedish architect Johan Fredrik Åbom, and built during 1874–1882, in a neo-gothic style. The interior of the first floor was designed and painted by Carl Grabow, one of Sweden's most famous interior decorators and painters of the time.

The next major restoration of the castle was done in 1925–1927, under the leadership of the Swedish architect Ivar Tengbom. Parts of the castle were given a more 18th century design, and the landscape architect Rudolf Abelin designed new gardens.

== See also ==
- List of castles and palaces in Sweden
