= Tunnerstad =

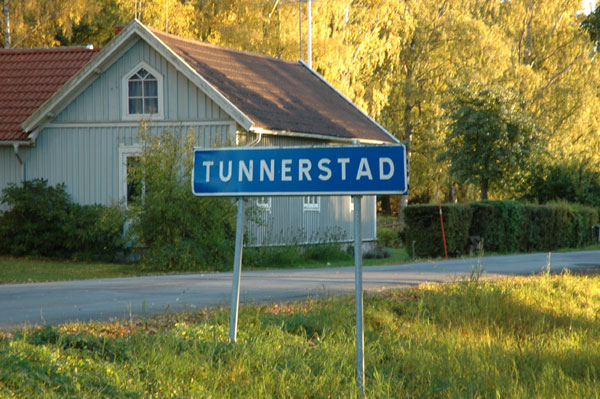
- Tunnerstad in October 2005

- Location within Jönköping Location within Sweden
- Coordinates: 58°03′N 14°19′E
- Country: Sweden
- Province: Småland
- County: Jönköping County
- Municipality: Jönköping Municipality

Area
  - Total: 1.02 km^{2} (0.39 sq mi)

Population (31 December 2010)
  - Total: 295
  - Density: 290/km^{2} (750/sq mi)
- Time zone: UTC+1 (CET)
  - Summer (DST): UTC+2 (CEST)
- Climate: Dfb

Tunnerstad is a locality situated on the island of Visingsö in Jönköping Municipality, Jönköping County, Sweden, and had 295 inhabitants in 2010.
