= Norrahammar =

Coordinates: 57°42′N 14°06′E

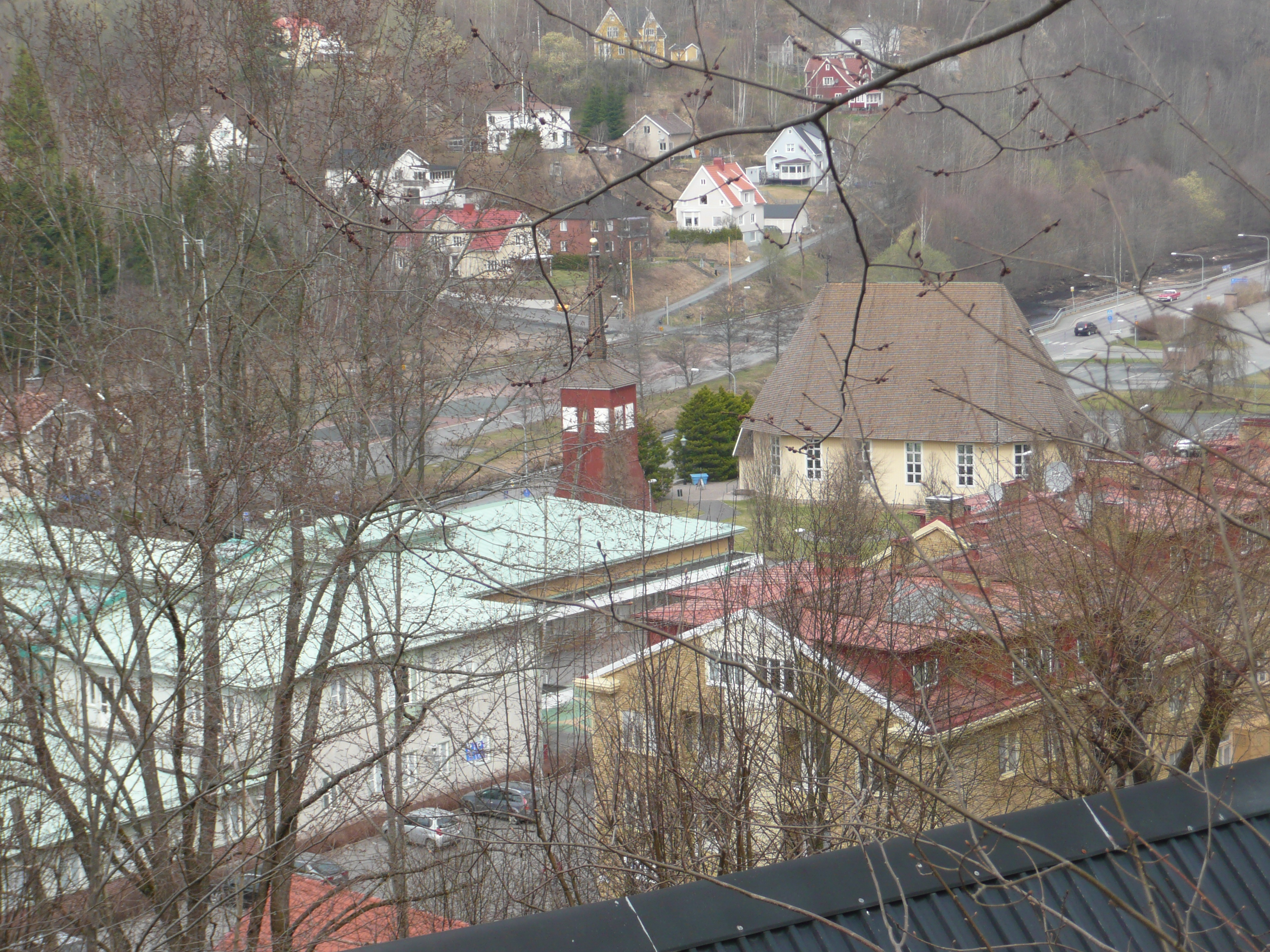
Central Norrahammar

Norrahammar (Swedish pronunciation: [nɔraˈhâmːar]) is a part of the Jönköping locality in Sweden. It has been part of the town since the 1970s. It is located 10 km south of Jönköping within the Jönköping Municipality in the county of Jönköping in Sweden.

Norrahammar, early 20th century postcard image
