= Bankeryd Church =

Coordinates: 57.8501°N 14.1142°E

- Bankeryds kyrka
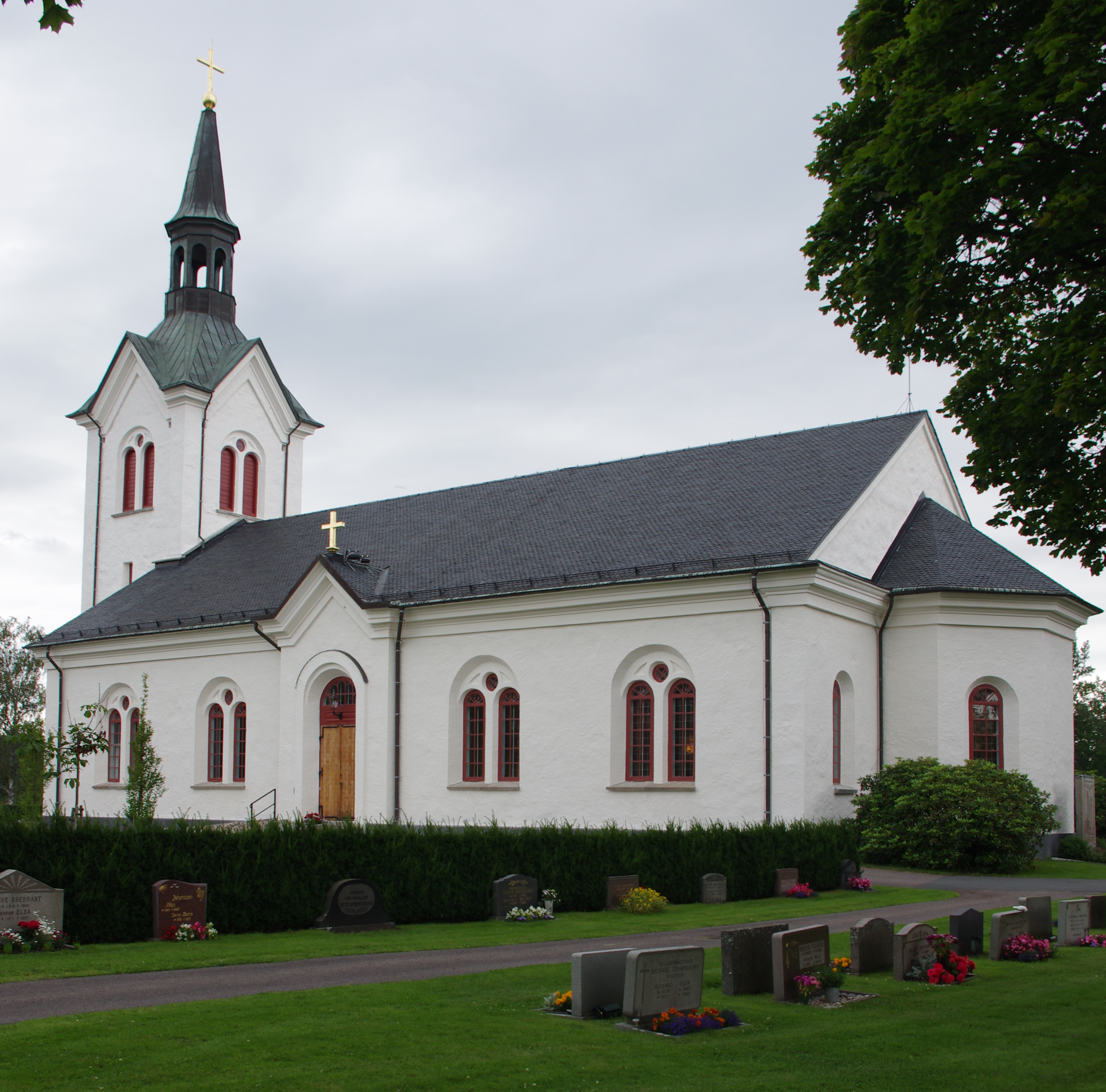
- Bankeryd Church in July 2011
- Bankeryd Church
- Location: Bankeryd
- Country: Sweden
- Denomination: Church of Sweden

History
- Consecrated: 30 August 1868

Administration
- Diocese: Växjö
- Parish: Bankeryd

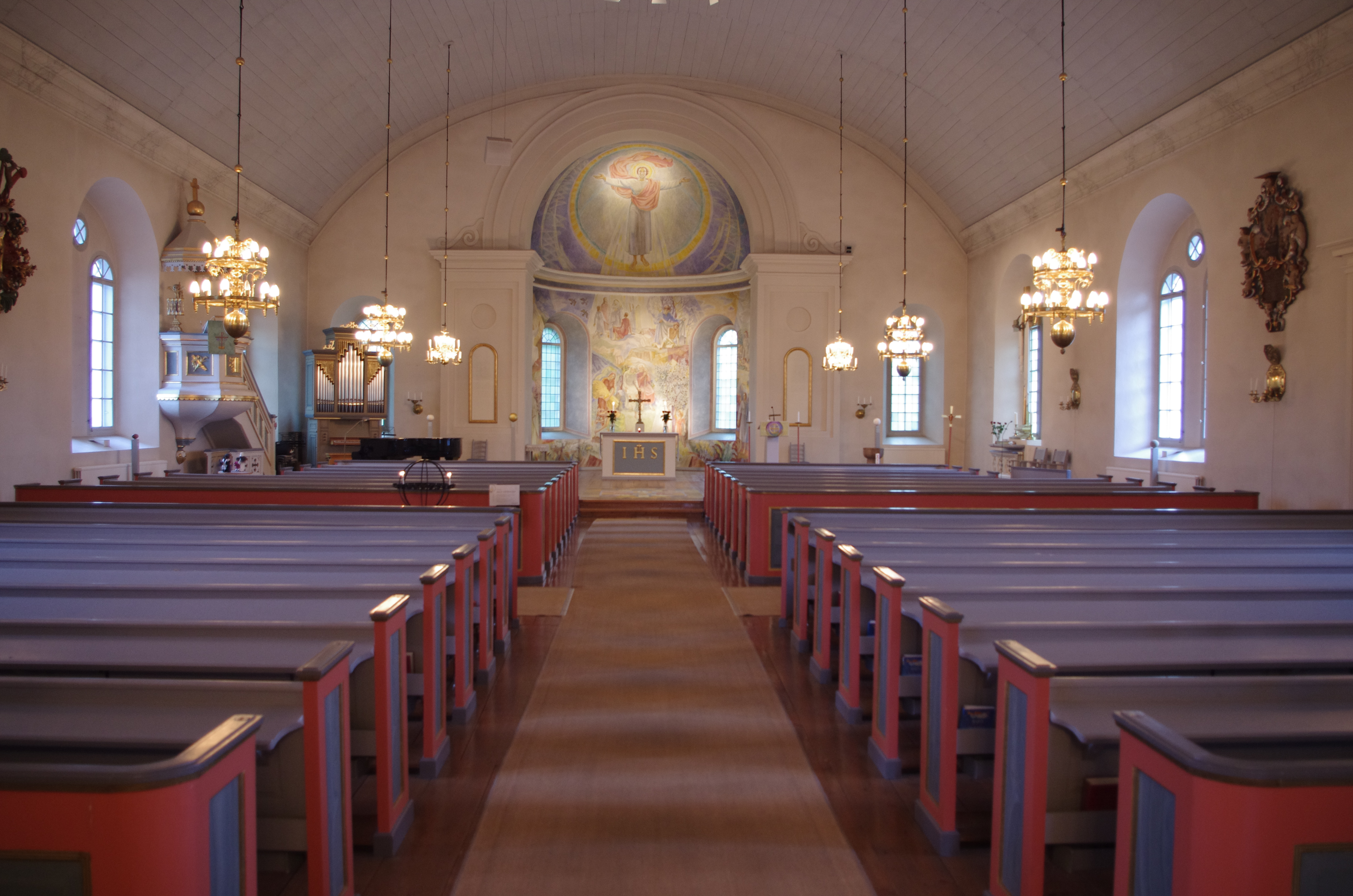
Inside Bankeryd Church

Bankeryd Church (Swedish: Bankeryds kyrka) is a church in Bankeryd in Sweden. Belonging to Bankeryd Parish of the Church of Sweden, it was inaugurated on 30 August 1868.
