= Jönköping Municipality =

Jönköping Municipality Jönköpings kommun
- Municipality
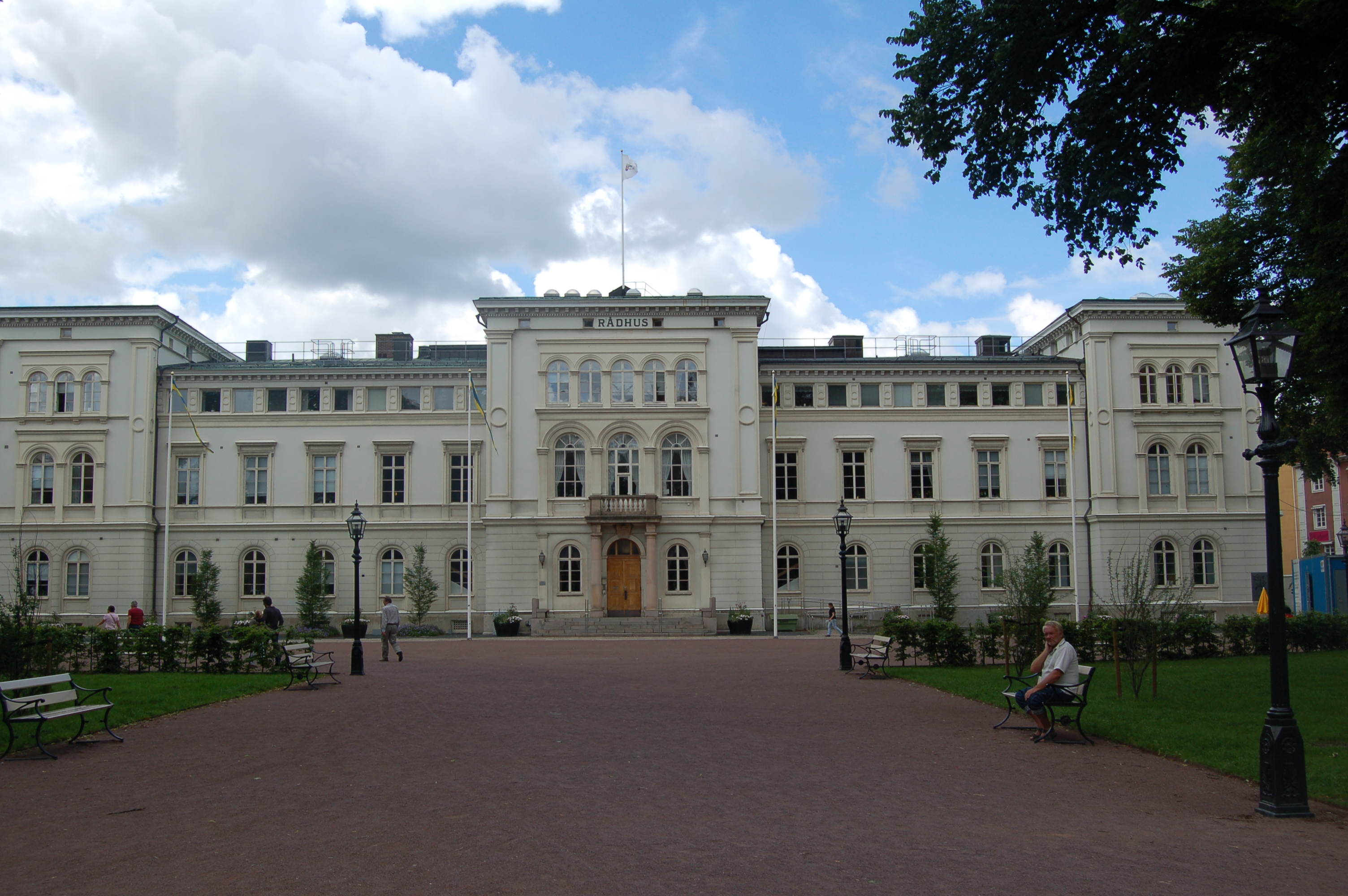
- Jönköping City Hall

- Flag Coat of arms

- Coordinates: 57°47′N 14°12′E
- Country: Sweden
- County: Jönköping County
- Seat: Jönköping

Area
  - Total: 1,925.02 km^{2} (743.25 sq mi)
  - Land: 1,480.36 km^{2} (571.57 sq mi)
  - Water: 444.66 km^{2} (171.68 sq mi)
- Area as of 1 January 2014.

Population (30 June 2025)
  - Total: 147,525
  - Density: 99.6548/km^{2} (258.105/sq mi)
- Time zone: UTC+1 (CET)
  - Summer (DST): UTC+2 (CEST)
- ISO 3166 code: SE
- Province: Småland
- Municipal code: 0680
- Website: www.jonkoping.se

Jönköping Municipality (Swedish: Jönköpings kommun) is a municipality in Jönköping County, southern Sweden. The city of Jönköping is the municipal seat. The municipality is situated by the southern end of lake Vättern.

== Historical background ==
The area of the present municipality consists of more than 20 original municipal entities, among them three former cities. In 1952 the number of units was reduced to 13. The present municipality was created in connection with the nationwide local government reform of 1971.

== Localities ==
There are 17 urban areas (also called a Tätort or locality) in Jönköping Municipality.

In the table the localities are listed according to the size of the population as of December 31, 2015. The municipal seat is in bold characters.

#	Locality	Population	Notes
1	**Jönköping**	93,797	includes Huskvarna, Hovslätt, Lockebo and Norrahammar
2	Bankeryd	8,506	includes Trånghalla
3	Taberg	4,486	includes Månsarp
4	Tenhult	3,112	
5	Gränna	2,726	
6	Odensjö	2,646	includes Barnarp
7	Kaxholmen	1,561	
8	Lekeryd	788	
9	Bottnaryd	717	
10	Kortebo	512	
11	Skärstad	433	
12	Ölmstad	401	
13	Örserum	356	
14	Tunnerstad	322	
15	Öggestorp	238	
16	Gissebo	204	
17	Ryd	200	

== Demographics ==
This is a demographic table based on Jönköping Municipality's electoral districts in the 2022 Swedish general election sourced from SVT's election platform, in turn taken from SCB official statistics.

In total there were 107,336 Swedish citizens of voting age. 46.4% voted for the left coalition and 52.3% for the right coalition. Indicators are in percentage points except population totals and income.

Location	Residents	Citizen adults	Left vote	Right vote	Employed	Swedish parents	Foreign heritage	Income SEK	Degree
Location			%	%					
Angerdshestra-Mulseryd	1,242	945	31.6	67.6	87	90	10	26,875	30
Attarp-Sjöåkra	1,813	1,435	50.5	48.5	81	81	19	22,382	37
Backamo	2,035	1,464	40.0	59.0	91	92	8	31,490	53
Barnarp	1,918	1,338	41.7	57.7	86	78	22	29,404	40
Barnarp C	1,766	1,315	40.5	57.9	83	73	27	27,802	35
Bondberget	1,664	1,257	53.3	46.2	85	63	37	27,361	51
Bottnaryd	1,331	959	36.8	61.9	84	85	15	24,706	38
Bymarken	2,058	1,498	42.4	57.1	85	86	14	34,119	67
Bäckalyckan	1,814	1,524	46.9	52.1	79	86	14	26,229	64
Centrum V	1,388	1,197	40.9	57.5	75	77	23	25,236	52
Centrum Ö	1,893	1,597	45.4	52.8	76	74	26	25,206	52
Dunkehalla	2,215	1,688	45.2	54.4	83	87	13	30,951	68
Egnahem-Fagerslätt	2,411	1,639	46.1	53.5	89	86	14	31,368	55
Ekhagen N	1,456	1,066	53.6	45.3	73	52	48	20,919	33
Ekhagen S	1,691	1,147	51.8	46.9	61	52	48	19,666	46
Erik Dahlberg	1,886	1,474	47.7	51.3	72	69	31	23,711	48
Friaredalen	1,591	1,380	46.9	52.0	82	82	18	25,773	48
Gränna N	1,971	1,553	42.7	55.8	78	87	13	22,179	39
Gränna S	1,893	1,542	42.0	57.1	86	88	12	24,781	43
Gräshagen-Torpa	1,844	1,436	47.7	51.4	78	80	20	27,384	52
Hisingstorp-Dalvik	2,074	1,480	44.2	54.9	77	77	23	26,751	61
Hovslätt	1,993	1,406	43.4	55.8	88	88	12	30,783	55
Hovslätt N	1,928	1,404	54.2	44.6	88	83	17	28,557	54
Hovslätt S-Norrahammar	1,964	1,330	44.3	53.9	78	72	28	25,087	35
Huskvarna Bråneryd	1,486	1,020	57.5	41.0	73	47	53	22,689	37
Huskvarna C	1,826	1,498	51.4	46.7	73	67	33	19,755	34
Huskvarna Gråbo	1,909	1,430	50.7	48.3	78	59	41	24,102	42
Huskvarna Smedbyn	1,548	1,078	48.1	50.2	73	54	46	23,237	37
Huskvarna Tormenås	1,919	1,383	53.0	45.6	82	68	32	26,847	43
Kaxholmen	2,316	1,641	42.4	56.6	91	92	8	29,514	53
Kortebo-Åbolid	1,338	995	42.2	56.0	74	66	34	26,067	56
Kungsängen-Ekhagen	1,636	1,221	50.8	48.1	89	61	39	28,837	55
Kålgården V	1,485	1,419	44.2	54.9	83	78	22	28,799	49
Kålgården Ö	1,489	1,341	43.8	55.6	86	76	24	31,246	58
Kättilstorp Haga	2,166	1,682	47.4	51.4	86	84	16	28,278	49
Lekeryd-Järsnäs	2,475	1,871	32.8	66.6	90	96	4	28,305	37
Liljeholmen	1,630	1,339	52.2	46.3	79	70	30	24,687	41
Liljeholmsparken	1,456	1,305	52.4	46.0	80	80	20	26,890	54
Ljungarum	2,227	1,685	52.0	47.1	84	83	17	27,971	45
Mariebo	2,116	1,539	45.4	54.0	87	85	15	31,580	56
Munksjö	1,880	1,646	52.7	46.2	80	80	20	25,142	52
Munksjöstaden	1,303	1,193	37.0	62.0	81	70	30	29,078	61
Månsarp	1,534	1,138	47.1	51.5	87	91	9	27,686	36
Norrahammar C-Flahult	1,986	1,439	45.1	54.0	86	77	23	28,403	45
Norrahammar S	2,049	1,359	47.6	51.5	82	73	27	25,461	36
Norrängen-Brunstorp	2,149	1,698	38.1	60.6	86	74	26	30,334	54
Nyarp	2,018	1,503	42.8	56.1	88	89	11	30,148	60
Petersberg-Jutaholm	1,667	1,188	40.7	58.4	89	84	16	30,528	48
Rosendala	1,741	1,357	46.5	52.0	78	70	30	23,906	40
Rosenlund N	1,396	1,022	43.3	54.9	77	70	30	24,896	46
Rosenlund S	1,478	1,191	51.5	47.6	79	70	30	25,030	45
Råslätt V	2,119	1,253	67.8	24.6	62	18	82	15,740	27
Råslätt Ö	1,941	1,271	65.9	27.8	60	27	73	16,006	26
Råslätt-Lockebo	1,885	888	64.7	28.9	43	21	79	9,972	46
Samset-Sveahäll	1,920	1,226	43.2	55.7	88	77	23	31,298	59
Skänkeberg-Dalvik	2,118	1,575	47.0	51.8	82	80	20	26,954	53
Skärstad-Svarttorp	2,207	1,608	35.6	62.9	88	92	8	27,079	43
Sofia	1,332	1,232	50.5	48.6	75	75	25	21,886	47
Stensholm-Jöransberg	1,957	1,388	43.9	54.5	90	86	14	30,758	50
Söder	1,839	1,608	49.0	49.7	80	82	18	25,477	53
Taberg V	1,626	1,214	41.4	57.5	91	92	8	29,115	43
Taberg Ö	1,774	1,262	42.9	56.5	88	89	11	28,858	39
Tenhult C	1,883	1,355	40.4	59.1	89	91	9	28,699	44
Tenhult N-Öggestorp	1,916	1,337	37.4	62.0	88	91	9	29,179	40
Tenhult S-Ödestugu	1,520	1,095	39.4	59.4	88	92	8	29,036	38
Tokarp	1,668	1,387	53.4	45.0	86	82	18	28,622	49
Torp	1,879	1,361	49.6	50.0	91	90	10	33,218	64
Torpa V	1,631	1,284	51.2	48.3	74	82	18	24,490	60
Torpa Ö	1,396	1,203	48.5	50.9	84	85	15	26,673	49
Trånghalla-Järstorp	2,224	1,646	37.5	61.8	87	88	12	31,664	55
Visingsö	720	593	53.7	44.2	79	93	7	22,073	30
Västra Torget	1,408	1,152	48.9	49.5	67	74	26	18,032	58
Vätterslund	1,348	1,059	38.5	61.1	87	87	13	32,100	66
Vättersnäs	1,681	1,301	44.4	54.4	84	78	22	28,447	52
Ölmstad	2,019	1,465	41.0	58.0	90	95	5	28,426	43
Österängen V	1,865	1,180	64.8	30.0	63	26	74	17,965	31
Österängen Ö	1,888	1,268	62.9	35.0	67	30	70	19,337	36
Öxnehaga C	1,626	1,047	61.4	36.3	65	24	76	18,134	26
Öxnehaga N	1,843	1,424	56.7	41.6	76	37	63	22,579	38
Öxnehaga S	2,085	1,399	56.8	41.3	74	36	64	22,041	34
Source: SVT

== Sport ==
International Floorball Federation was founded in the eastern part of Jönköping, in Huskvarna, 1986.

== Twin towns – sister cities ==
Jönköping is twinned with:

- Bodø, Norway
- Kuopio, Finland
- Lääne-Viru County, Estonia
- Svendborg, Denmark
- Tianjin, China

== See also ==
- Municipalities of Sweden
- Swedish National Board of Agriculture
- List of Jönköping Governors
