= Viktor Andersson =

Viktor Andersson may refer to:

- Viktor Andersson (racing driver) (born 2003), Swedish racing driver
- Viktor Andersson (skier) (born 1992), Swedish freestyle skier
- Viktor Andersson (floorball) (born 1982), Swedish floorball player
- Viktor Andersson (footballer) (born 2004), Swedish footballer
