= Utvängstorp Church =

Coordinates: 58.0402°N 13.8730°E

- Utvängstorps kyrka
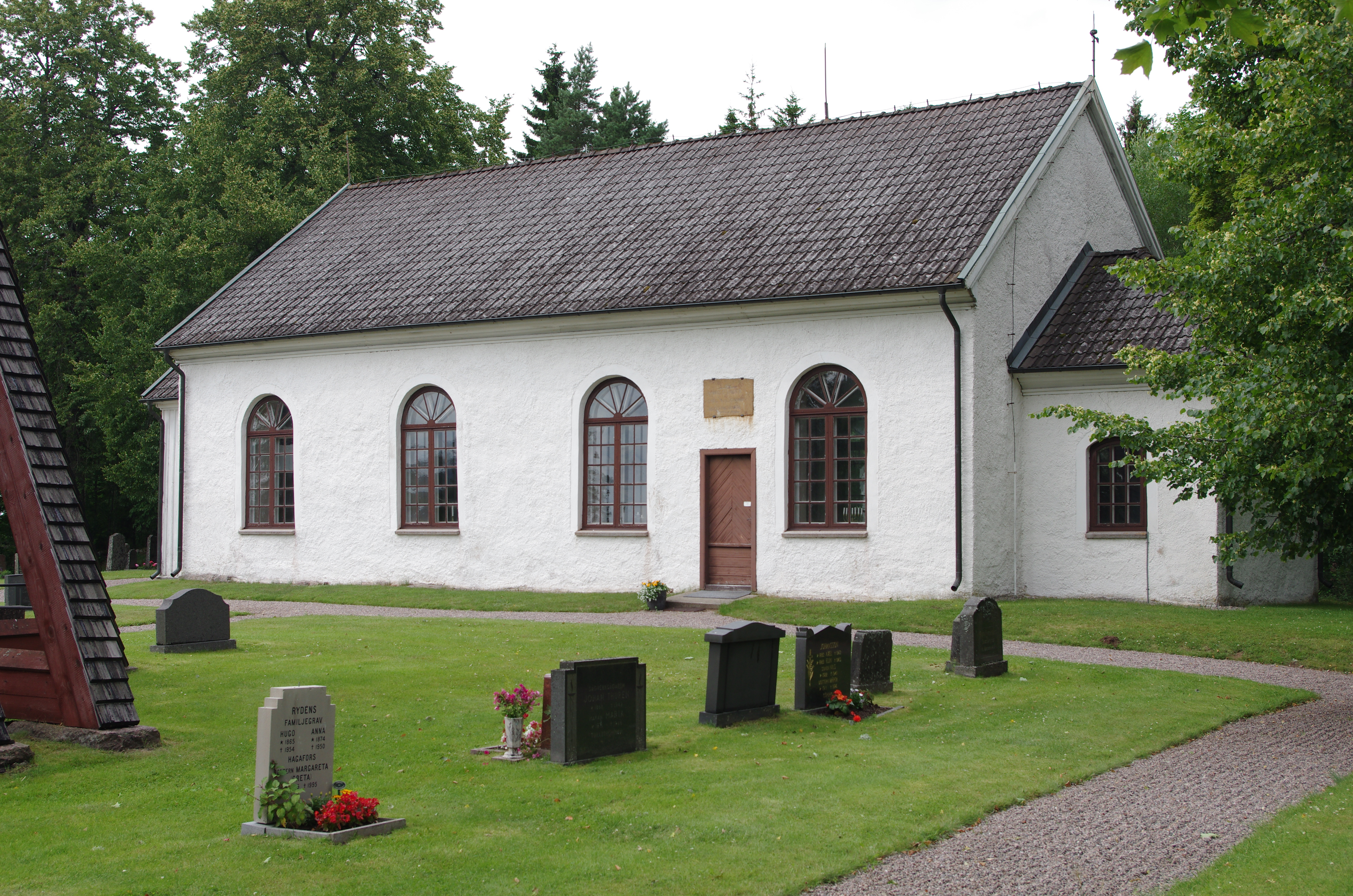
- Utvängstorp Church in July 2011
- Utvängstorp Church
- Location: Mullsjö Municipality
- Country: Sweden
- Denomination: Church of Sweden

Administration
- Diocese: Skara
- Parish: Mullsjö-Sandhem

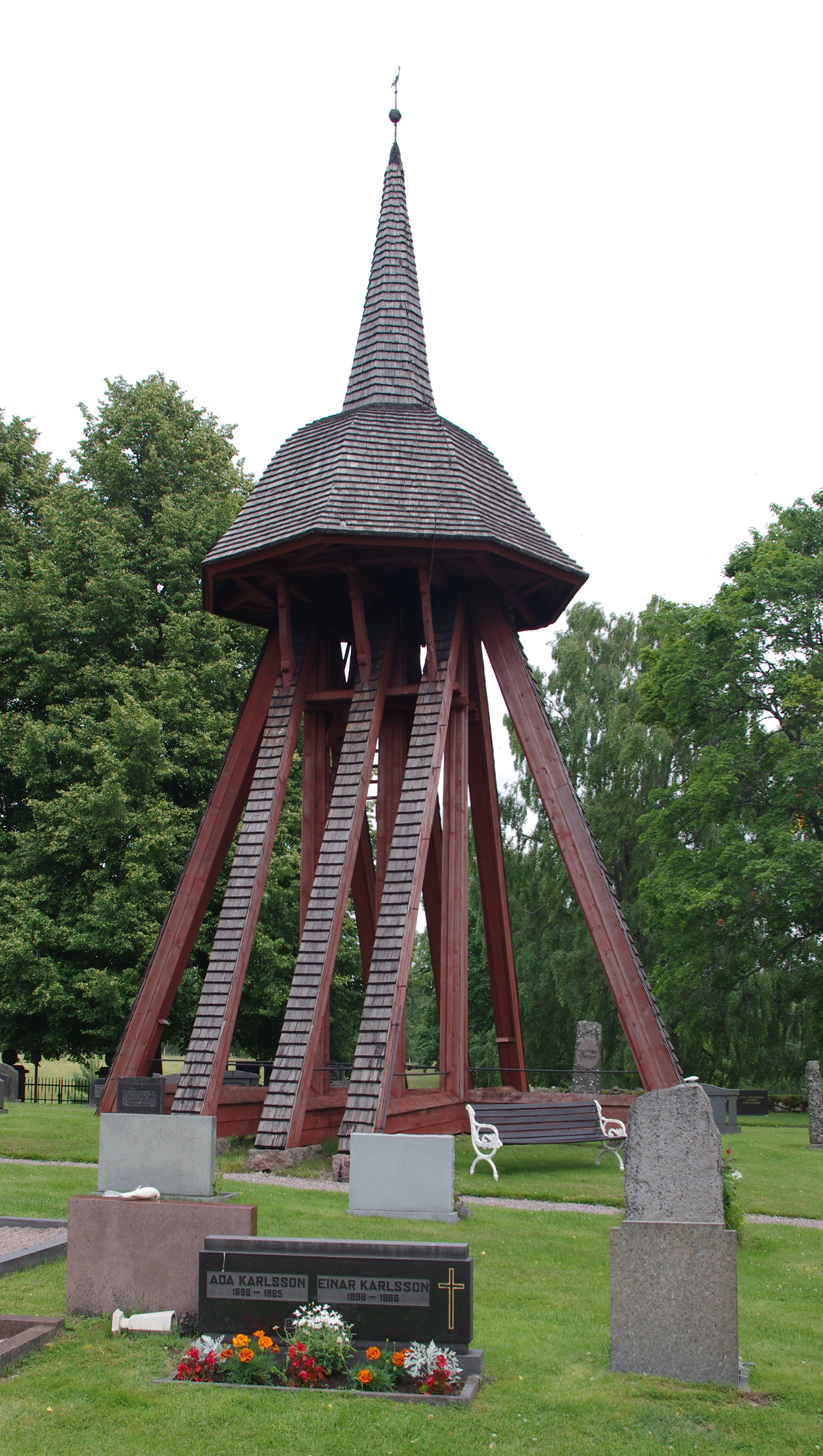
Utvängstorp Church bell tower

Utvängstorp Church (Swedish: Utvängstorps kyrka) is a medieval church at Mullsjö Municipality in Jönköping County, Sweden. It belongs to the Mullsjö-Sandhem Parish (Mullsjö-Sandhems församling) of the Church of Sweden. The church is located about 20 kilometers north of Mullsjö, the central city of Mullsjö municipality.

== History ==
The church dates back to the later 12th century. It is built of stone with whitewashed facades. Just south of the church stands a bell tower from 1735. In 1838, the church underwent a thorough rebuilding and extension with a new choir area to the east and new sacristy east of the choir. In 1960 the interior was restored. In 1989 a major renovation was conducted.
