= Mullsjö AIS =

Floorball club in Mullsjö, Sweden

- Full name: Mullsjö Allmänna Innebandysällskap
- Short name: MAIS
- Founded: 1 November 1989
- Arena: Nyhemshallen

Mullsjö AIS is a professional floorball club in Mullsjö, Sweden, established on 1 November 1989 by a group from the Mullsjö Mission Covenant Church. On 2 March 2008, the men's team qualified for the Swedish top division.

== Roster ==
As of August 28th, 2020

#	Nat.	Player	Pos.	Grip	Age	Acquired	Birthplace
59	(Sweden)	Jonathan Larsson	G		30
92	(Sweden)	Simon Lööf	G		33
10	(Sweden)	Joel Dagman	D	L	33
13	(Sweden)	Casper Härnborg	D		22
14	(Norway)	Daniel Gidske	D	L	32
16	(Sweden)	Kasper Hedlund	D	R	32
22	(Sweden)	Leo Olsson	D	L	23
27	(Sweden)	Anton Hedin	D	L	30
54	(Sweden)	Oskar Malmgren	D		27
77	(Sweden)	Robin Westergren	D	L	31
9	(Sweden)	Jesper Sankell	F	R	32
17	(Sweden)	Simon Karlsson	F	L	26
20	(Sweden)	Arvid Claesson	F		23
21	(Sweden)	Joel Ingesson	F	L	28
23	(Sweden)	Sebastian Palmqvist	F	L	31
25	(Sweden)	August Arvidsson	F		22
33	(Sweden)	Pelle Tarenius	F	R	29
34	(Sweden)	Kim Ganevik	F	L	32
37	(Sweden)	Gustav Johansson	F		25
40	(Sweden)	Rikard Eriksson	F	L	35
50	(Sweden)	Isaac Hall	F	L	27
61	(Switzerland)	Jan Zaugg	F	L	27
73	(Sweden)	Wille Knuthas	F	R	24
