= Mullsjö Secondary School =

- Mullsjö; Sweden

Information
- Type: Secondary school
- Opened: 1997

The Mullsjö Secondary School (Swedish: Mullsjö gymnasieskola) was a secondary school in Mullsjö, Sweden, opened for the 1997-1998 school year. In its final years, the school acted as a boarding school for young floorball players.

The school also won the Boys' Floorball World Championship in 2007, 2009 and 2011.

On 26 October 2010, the Mullsjö Municipal Council voted to close down the school following the 2010-2011 school year.
