= Kolthoff =

Kolthoff is a surname. Notable people with the surname include:

- Erick Kolthoff (born 1961), Puerto Rican judge
- Gustaf Kolthoff (1845–1913), Swedish naturalist
- Izaak Kolthoff (1894–1993), Dutch chemist
