= Mullsjö Municipality =

Mullsjö Municipality Mullsjö kommun
- Municipality
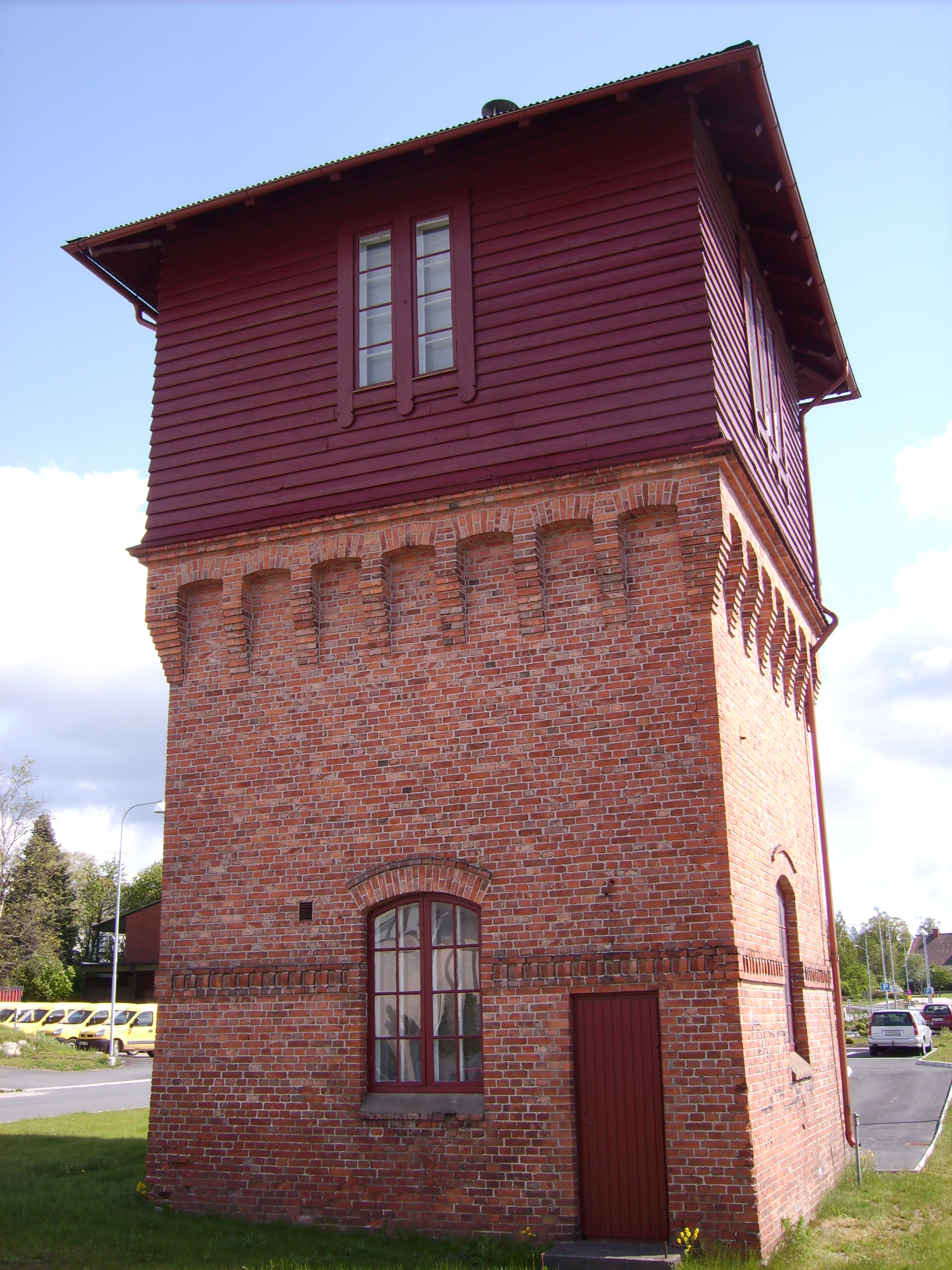
- Mullsjö Train Station

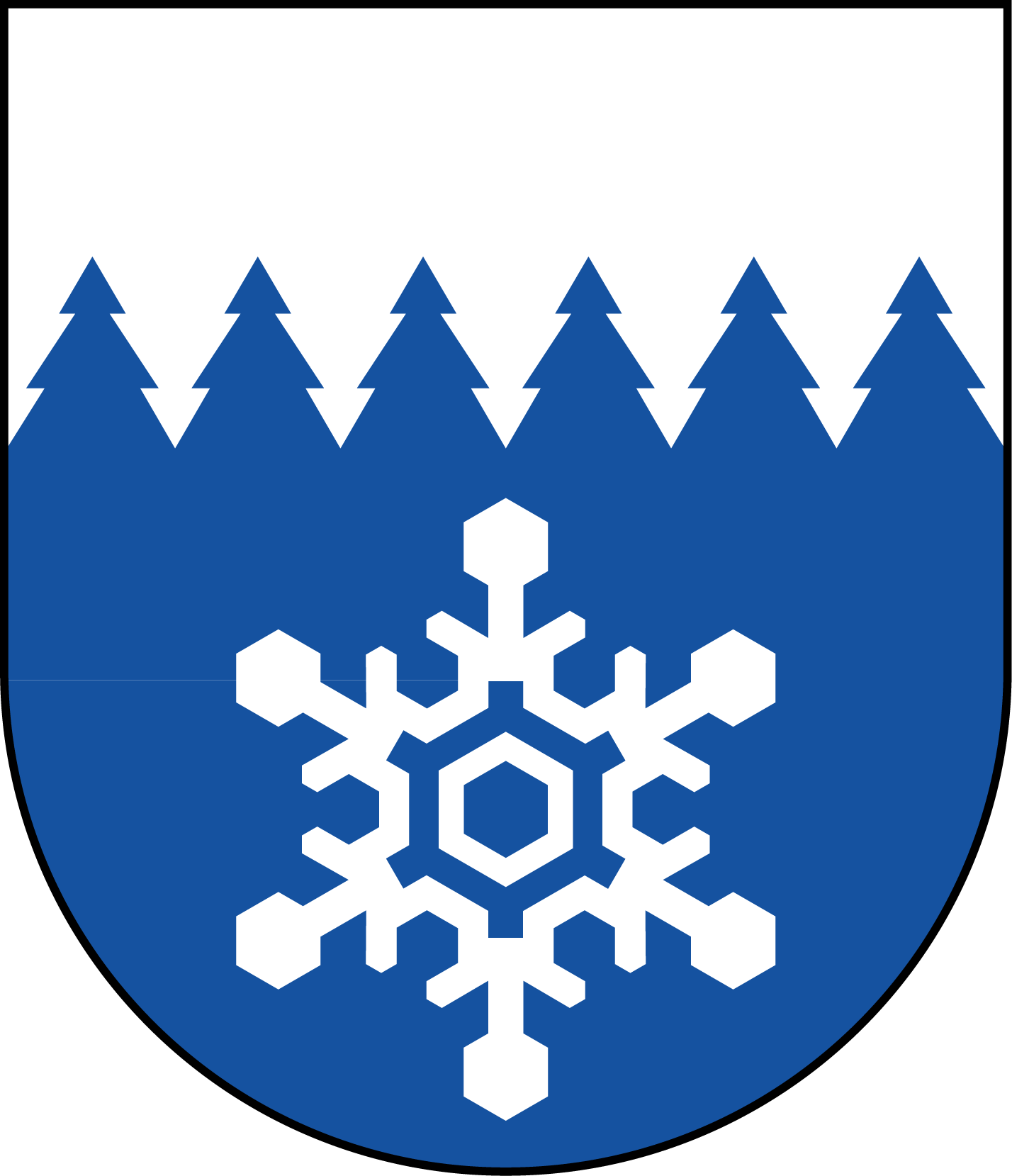
- Coat of arms

- Coordinates: 57°55′N 13°53′E
- Country: Sweden
- County: Jönköping County
- Seat: Mullsjö

Government
  - Municipal Council Commissioner: Linda Danielsson

Area
  - Total: 211.03 km^{2} (81.48 sq mi)
  - Land: 200.16 km^{2} (77.28 sq mi)
  - Water: 10.87 km^{2} (4.20 sq mi)
- Area as of 1 January 2014.

Population (30 June 2025)
  - Total: 7,569
  - Density: 37.81/km^{2} (97.94/sq mi)
- Time zone: UTC+1 (CET)
  - Summer (DST): UTC+2 (CEST)
- ISO 3166 code: SE
- Province: Västergötland
- Municipal code: 0642
- Website: www.mullsjo.se

Mullsjö Municipality (Swedish: Mullsjö kommun) is a municipality in Jönköping County, southern Sweden. Its seat is in the locality of Mullsjö.

The municipality was formed in 1952 by the amalgamation of four former entities. In 1998 it was transferred from the dissolved Skaraborg County to Jönköping County.

The geography is known for its many lakes and canoeing waters. In the winter, one may enjoy winter sports activities such as cross-country and down-hill skiing.

There is also a folk high school in Mullsjö.

== Localities ==
There are 2 urban areas (also called a Tätort or locality) in Mullsjö Municipality.

In the table the localities are listed according to the size of the population as of December 31, 2005. The municipal seat is in bold characters.

#	Locality	Population
1	**Mullsjö**	5,508
2	Sandhem	706

== Demographics ==
This is a demographic table based on Mullsjö Municipality's electoral districts in the 2022 Swedish general election sourced from SVT's election platform, in turn taken from SCB official statistics.

In total there were 7,427 residents, including 5,604 Swedish citizens of voting age. 39.4% voted for the left coalition and 59.1% for the right coalition. Indicators are in percentage points except population totals and income.

Location	Residents	Citizen adults	Left vote	Right vote	Employed	Swedish parents	Foreign heritage	Income SEK	Degree
Location			%	%					
Mullsjö 1	1,905	1,444	39.0	59.6	88	89	11	25,586	34
Mullsjö 2	2,069	1,549	38.5	60.6	84	86	14	25,815	33
Mullsjö 3	1,258	970	40.3	58.1	81	86	14	23,828	29
Mullsjö 4	2,195	1,641	39.7	58.3	84	84	16	25,597	36
Source: SVT

== Sights ==
Sights within the municipality include the scenic Ryfors Estates, with its park and nearby golfing course. Näs Lagård in Bjurbäck, southern part of Mullsjö, is one of Sweden's most famous places for classical chamber music. Bjurbäcks Konsthall - Artgallery and café. Näs Porthus in Bjurbäck, famous building of cultural historical interest. Also worthwhile is the House of Legends, a museum about Scandinavian folklore, such as trolls, giants, elves and gnomes. The 12-century Utvängstorp Church is located in the municipality.

Mullsjö also houses a small skiing resort called Knaggebo which has three different slopes.

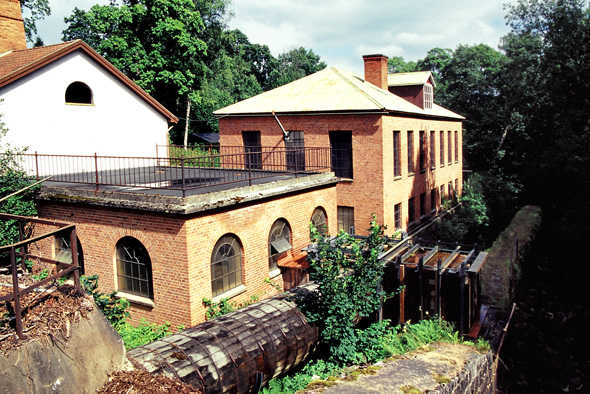
Ryfors Ironworks

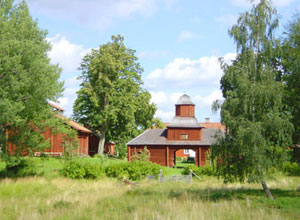
Näs Porthus
