= Mullsjö Folk High School =

Coordinates: 57.9051°N 13.8820°E

- Mullsjö; Sweden

Information
- Type: folk high school
- Opened: 1949

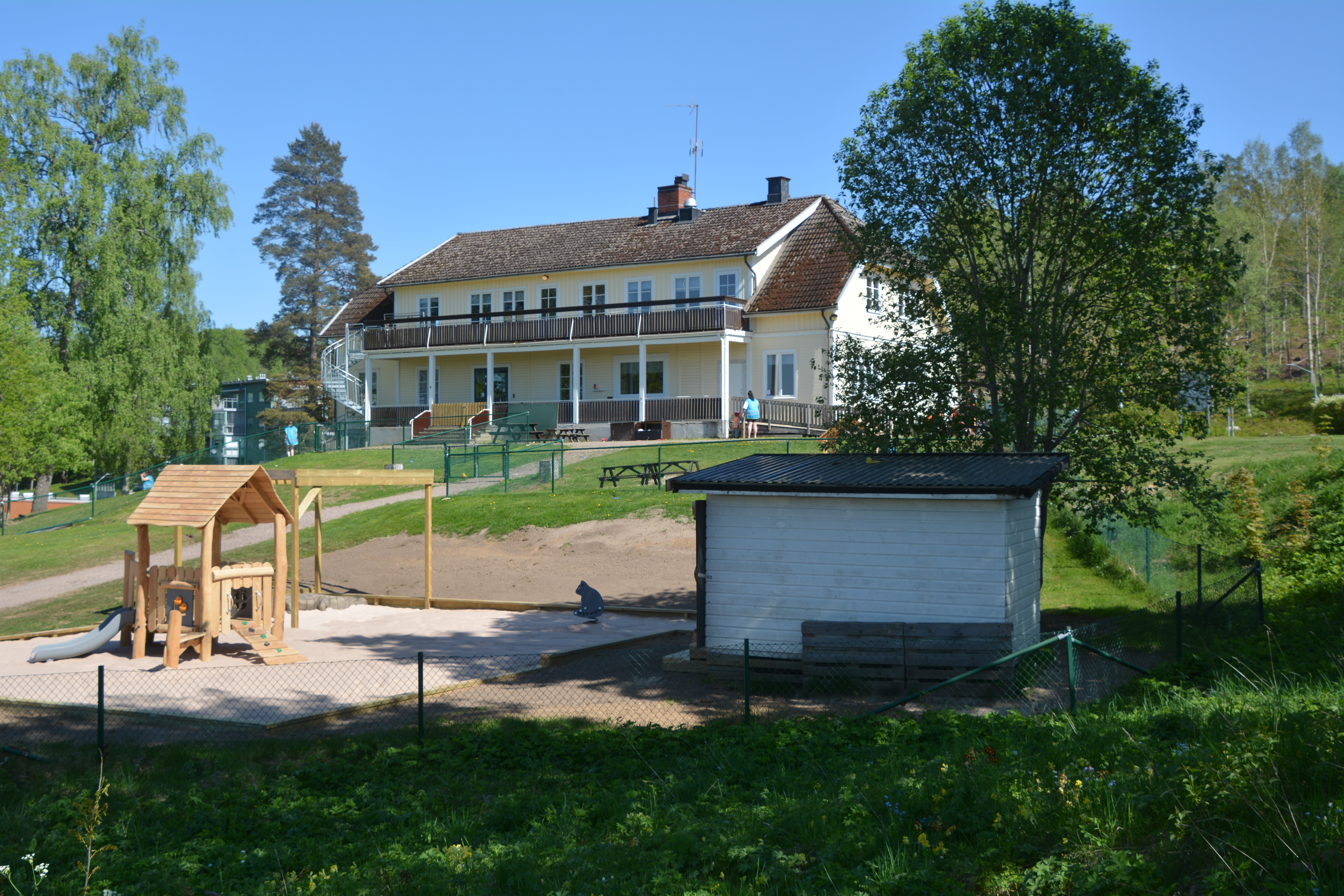
The school building.

The Mullsjö Folk High School (Swedish: Mullsjö folkhögskola) is a folk high school in Mullsjö, Sweden. It was established in 1949 in Jönköping and moved over to Mullsjö in 1950. The school is run by a foundation consisting of the Swedish Alliance Mission, its youth association and "Mullsjö folkhögskolas Kamratförbund".
