= Sandhem Church =

Coordinates: 57.9942°N 13.7861°E

- Sandhems kyrka
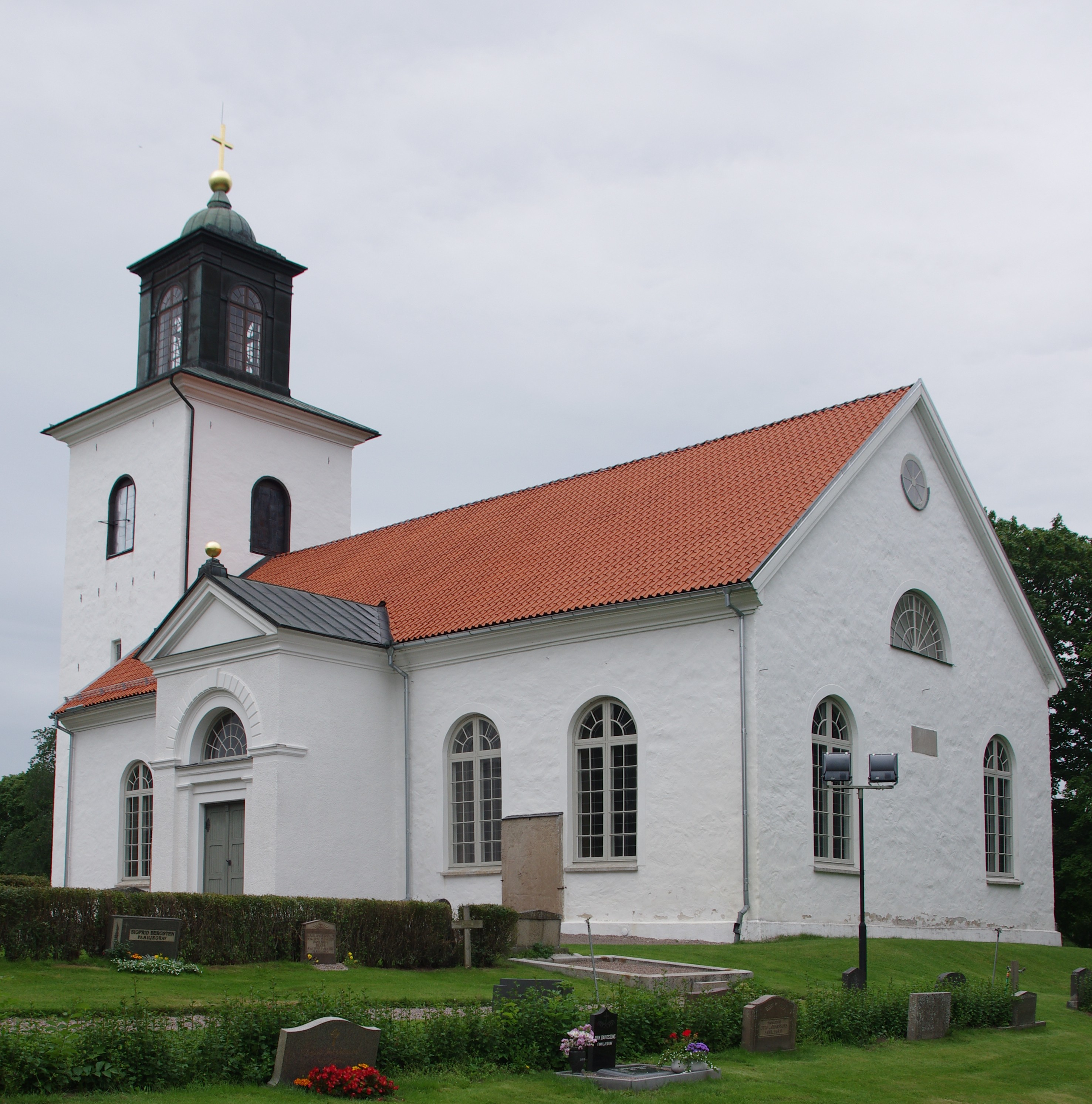
- Sandhem Church in July 2011
- Sandhem Church
- Location: Sandhem
- Country: Sweden
- Denomination: Church of Sweden

History
- Consecrated: 1841

Administration
- Diocese: Skara
- Parish: Mullsjö-Sandhem

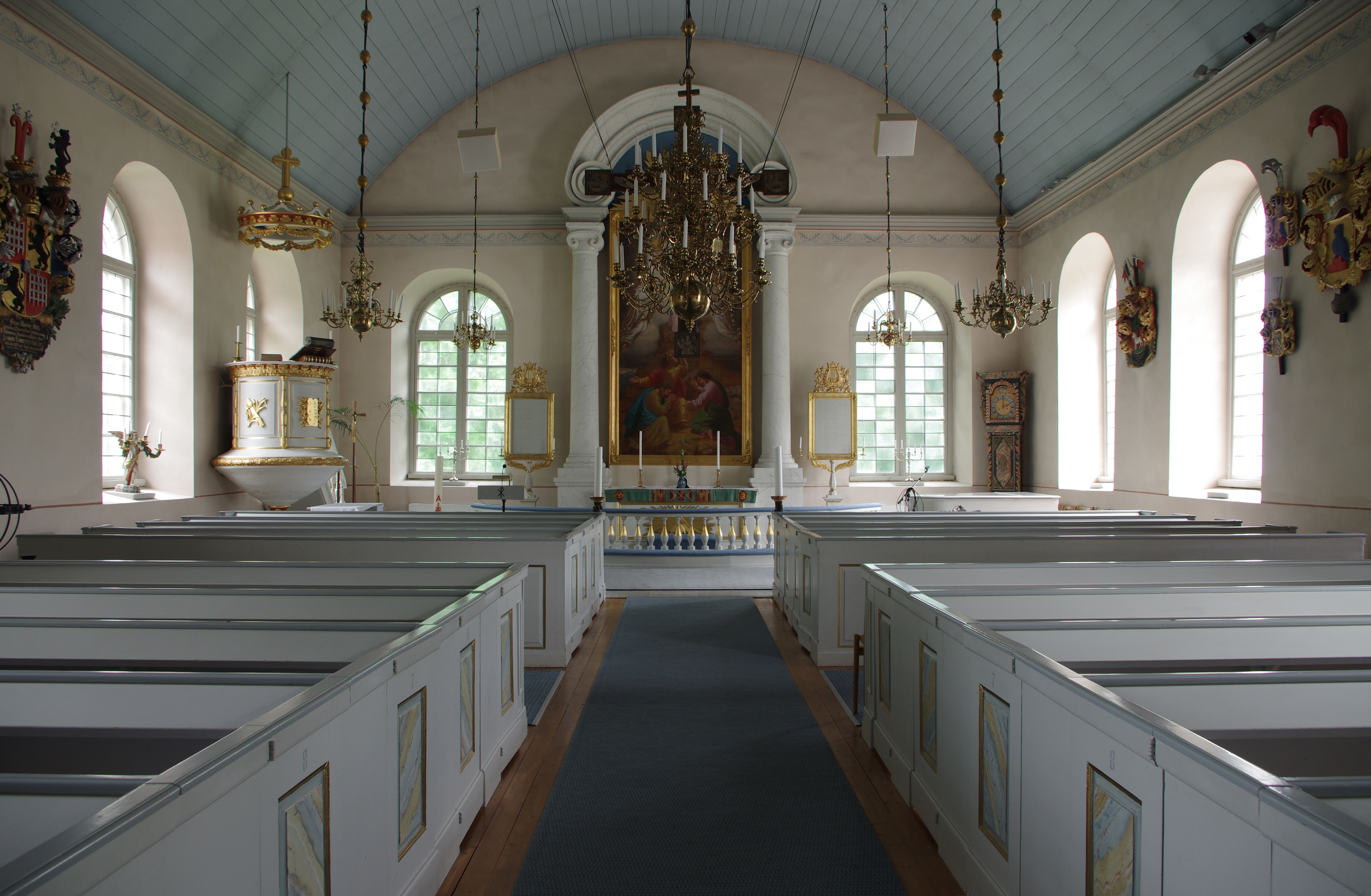
Inside Sandhem Church

Sandhem Church (Swedish: Sandhems kyrka) is a church in Sandhem in Sweden. Belonging to Mullsjö-Sandhem Parish of the Church of Sweden, it was inaugurated in 1841.
