= Mullsjö Mission Covenant Church =

Coordinates: 57.9093°N 14.0778°E

- Mullsjö missionskyrka
- Mullsjö Mission Covenant Church
- Location: Mullsjö
- Country: Sweden
- Denomination: Uniting Church in Sweden; Swedish Alliance Mission
- Previous denomination: Mission Covenant Church of Sweden

History
- Consecrated: 1992

Administration
- Parish: Mullsjö

The Mullsjö Mission Covenant Church (Swedish: Mullsjö missionskyrka) is a church building in Mullsjö, Sweden. It belongs to both the Uniting Church in Sweden and the Swedish Alliance Mission. The current building was opened in 1992 and replaced an older building dated back to 1922.
