= Gustaf Kolthoff =

Swedish ornithologist, taxidermist and naturalist

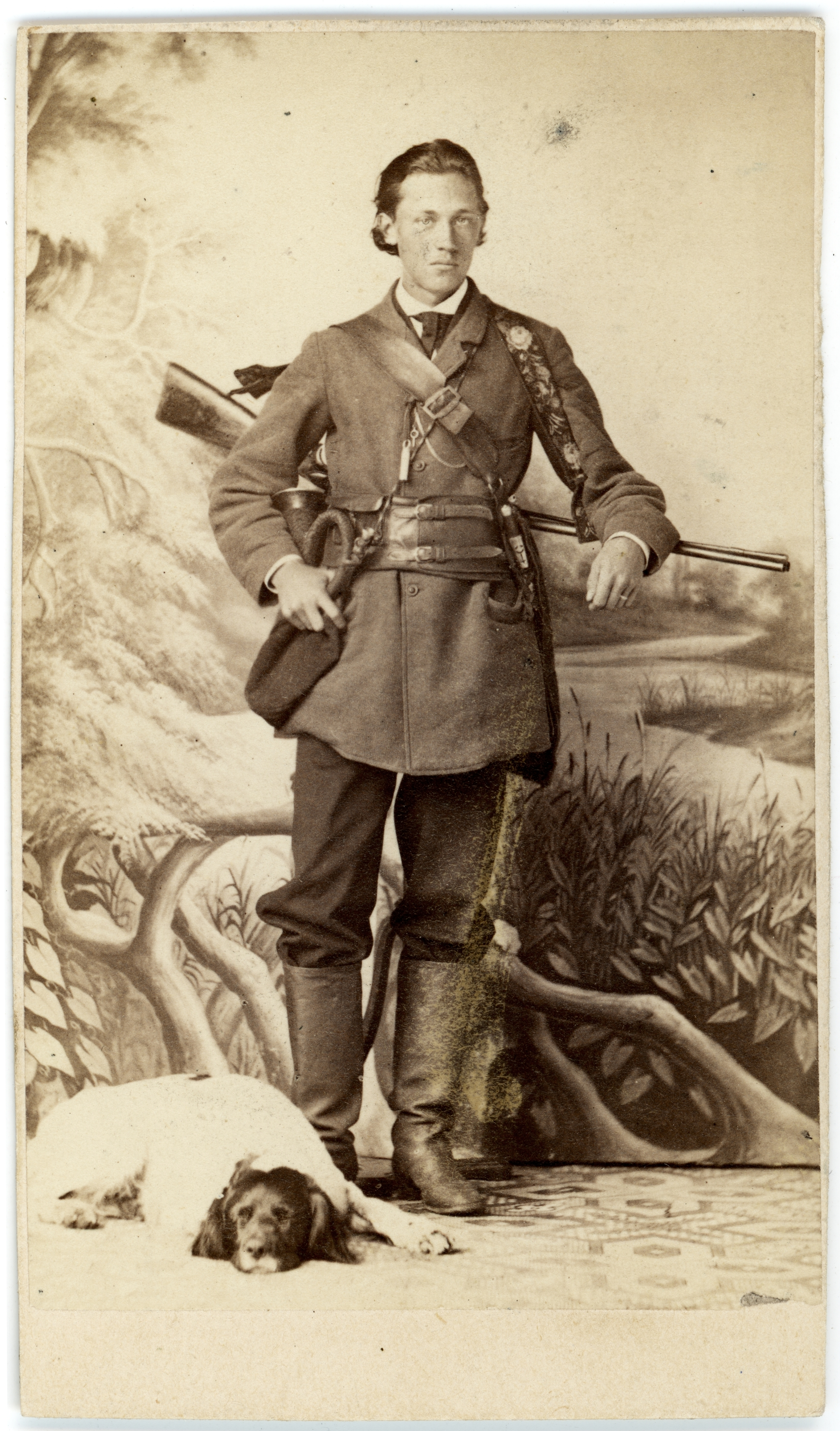
Gustaf Kolthoff ca. 1875.

Gustaf Isak Kolthoff (14 December 1845 – 25 October 1913) was a Swedish ornithologist, taxidermist and naturalist. He worked as a curator of the museum at Uppsala and set up a private museum where he is credited with the creation of the first naturalistic dioramas which became a popular format in European natural history museums.

== Biography ==
Kolthoff was born at Sandhem, Västergötland, the son of Johan Henrik Kolthoff and his wife Sara Gustafva née Friberger. He became a curator of the zoological museum in the University of Uppsala in 1878. He joined other naturalists on collecting expeditions, to Greenland in 1883 with Adolf Erik Nordenskiöld and in 1898 to the Norwegian Arctic coast with Alfred Gabriel Nathorst. He established a museum in Djurgården, Stockholm in 1893 along with Bruno Liljefors (who painted the backgrounds) and Carl Bovallius. Here he made dioramas depicting the Swedish coast, a boreal forest and other habitats. The use of dioramas in natural history museums spread to other parts of Europe and the US subsequently. He received an honorary doctorate in 1907 from the University of Uppsala.

Kolthoff married Beata Charlotte Lovisa née Lind in 1870. Their son Kjell Kolthoff also became a wildlife artist and conservationist.

Cape Kolthoff in Greenland (73°43.3 ́N 24°02.0 ́W) at the entrance of Moskusoksefjord was named by A.G. Nathorst after Kolthoff.
