= Viktor Andersson (floorball) =

Swedish floorball player

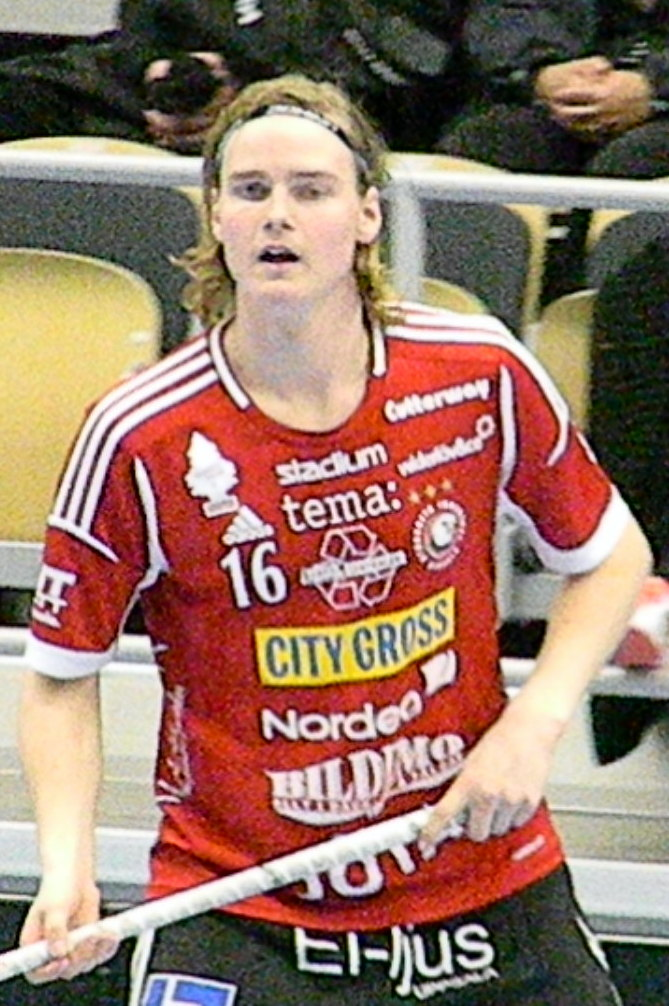
- Viktor Andersson

Personal information
- Born: 28 September 1982 (age 43)

Sport
- Country: Sweden
- Sport: floorball
- Position: defender
- Updated on 10 February 2015

Viktor Andersson, born 28 September 1982, is a Swedish floorball player. Being a defender, he has represented several club teams, and played in the SSL. His first club is Hagaboda SK.

== Clubs ==
Throughout the years, he has represented the following clubs:

- 1995/1996 - Fagerhult Habo IBK Ungdom, Sweden
- 1995/96 - 1998/99 - Fagerhult Habo IBK, Sweden
- 1999/00-2001/02 - Mullsjö AIS, Sweden
- 2001/2002-2003/04 - Jönköpings IK, Sweden
- 2003/2004-2004/2005 - Fagerhult Habo IBK, Sweden
- 2005/2006-2006/07 - Jönköpings IK, Sweden
- 2007/08 - Basel Magic, Switzerland
- 2008/09 - 2009/2010 - Mullsjö AIS, Sweden
- 2010/11 - Fagerhult Habo IBK, Sweden
- 2011/2012-2013/2014 - IBK Landskrona, Sweden
