= Nykyrka Church =

Coordinates: 57.9187°N 13.8574°E

- Nykyrka kyrka
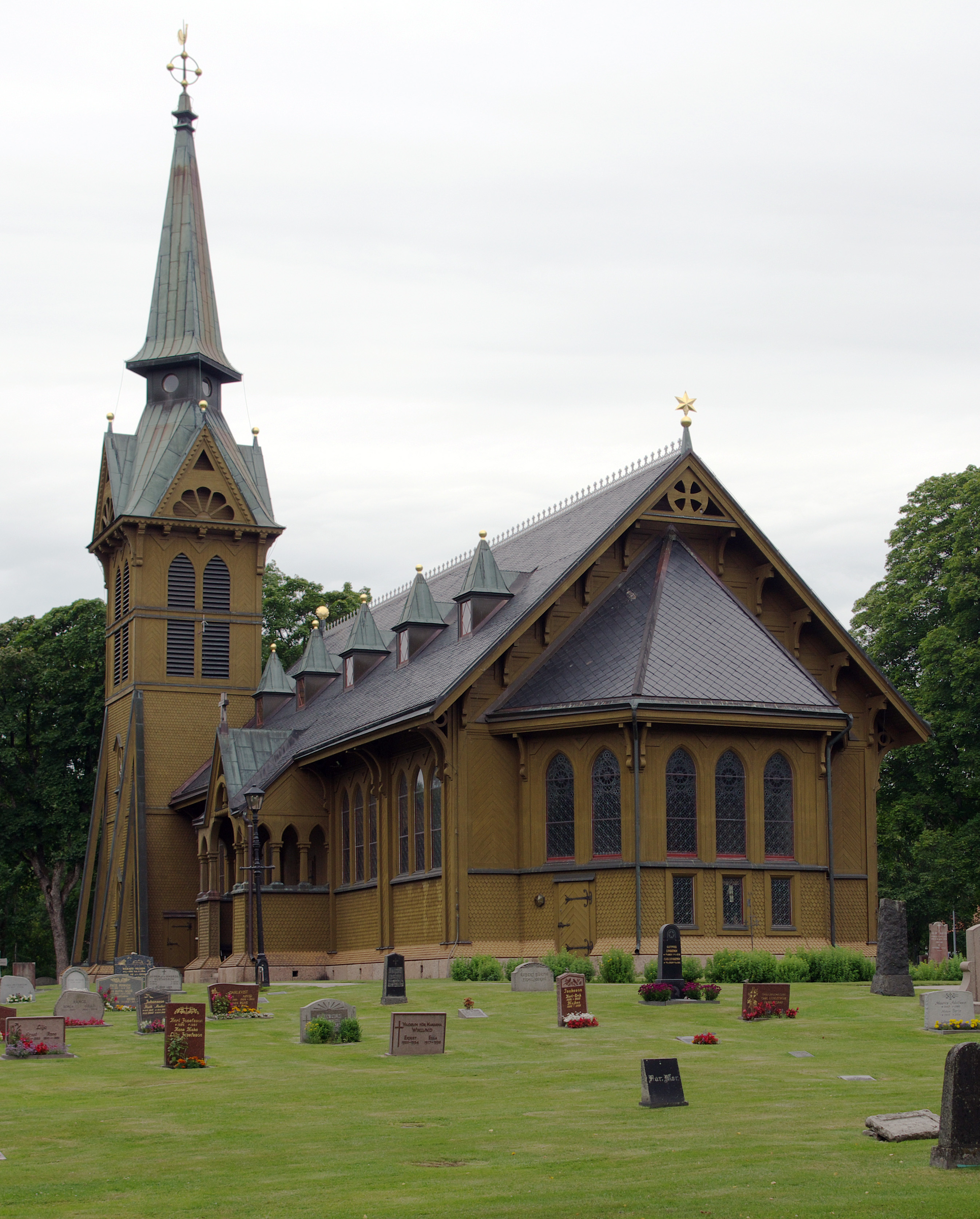
- Nykyrka Church in May 2011
- Nykyrka Church
- Location: Mullsjö
- Country: Sweden
- Denomination: Church of Sweden

History
- Consecrated: October 1887

Administration
- Diocese: Skara
- Parish: Mullsjö-Sandhem

Nykyrka Church (Swedish: Nykyrka kyrka) is a church building in the outer parts of western Mullsjö in Sweden. Belonging to the Mullsjö-Sandhem Parish of the Church of Sweden, it was opened in October 1887 replacing a 1656 church.
