= Sandhem =

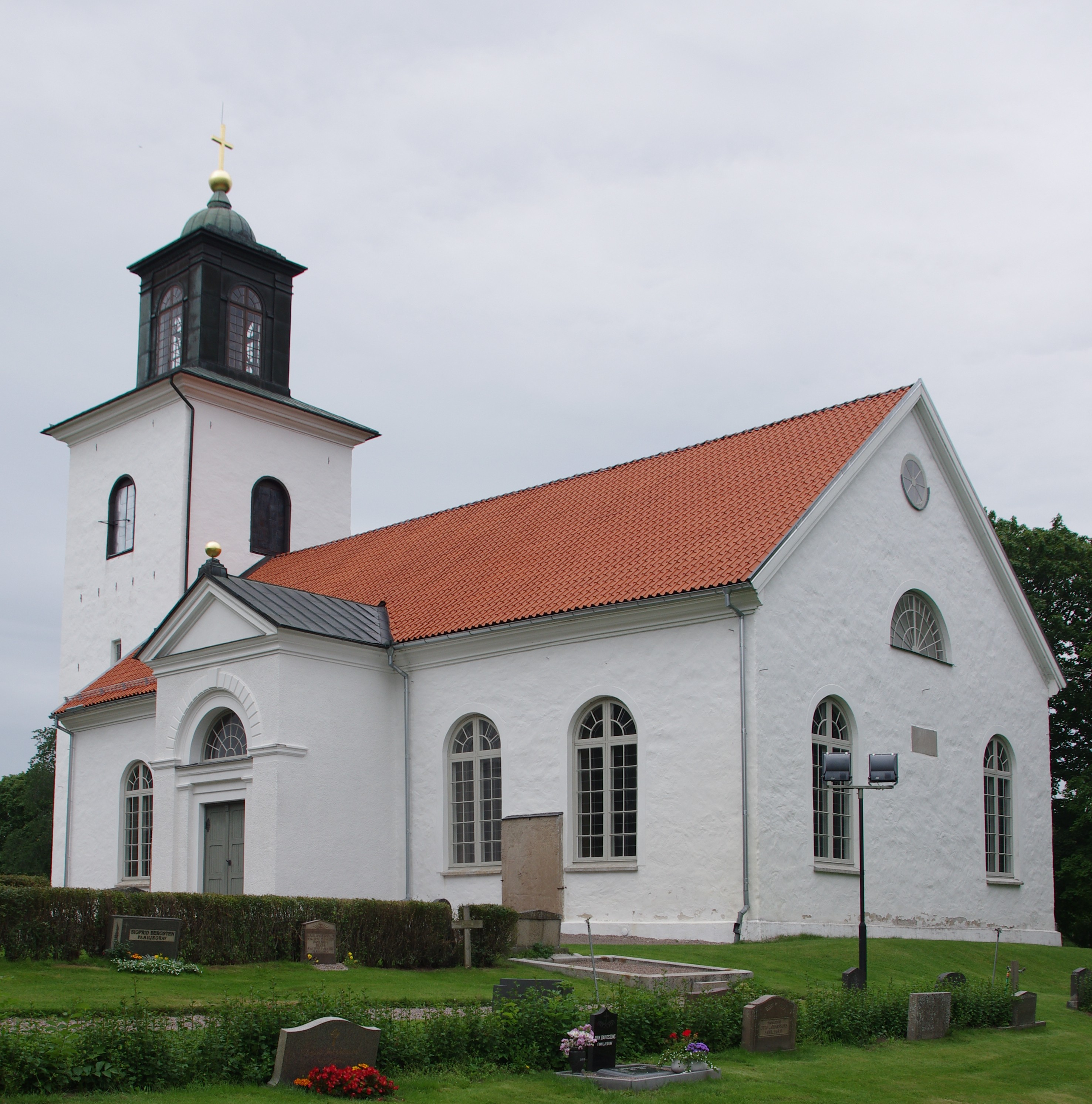
- Sandhem Church

- Location within Jönköping Location within Sweden Location within European Union
- Coordinates: 57°59′N 13°46′E
- Country: Sweden
- Province: Västergötland
- County: Jönköping County
- Municipality: Mullsjö Municipality

Area
  - Total: 1.32 km^{2} (0.51 sq mi)

Population (31 December 2010)
  - Total: 702
  - Density: 530/km^{2} (1,400/sq mi)
- Time zone: UTC+1 (CET)
  - Summer (DST): UTC+2 (CEST)
- Climate: Dfb

Sandhem is a locality situated in Mullsjö Municipality, Jönköping County, Sweden with 702 inhabitants in 2010.
