= Mullsjö =

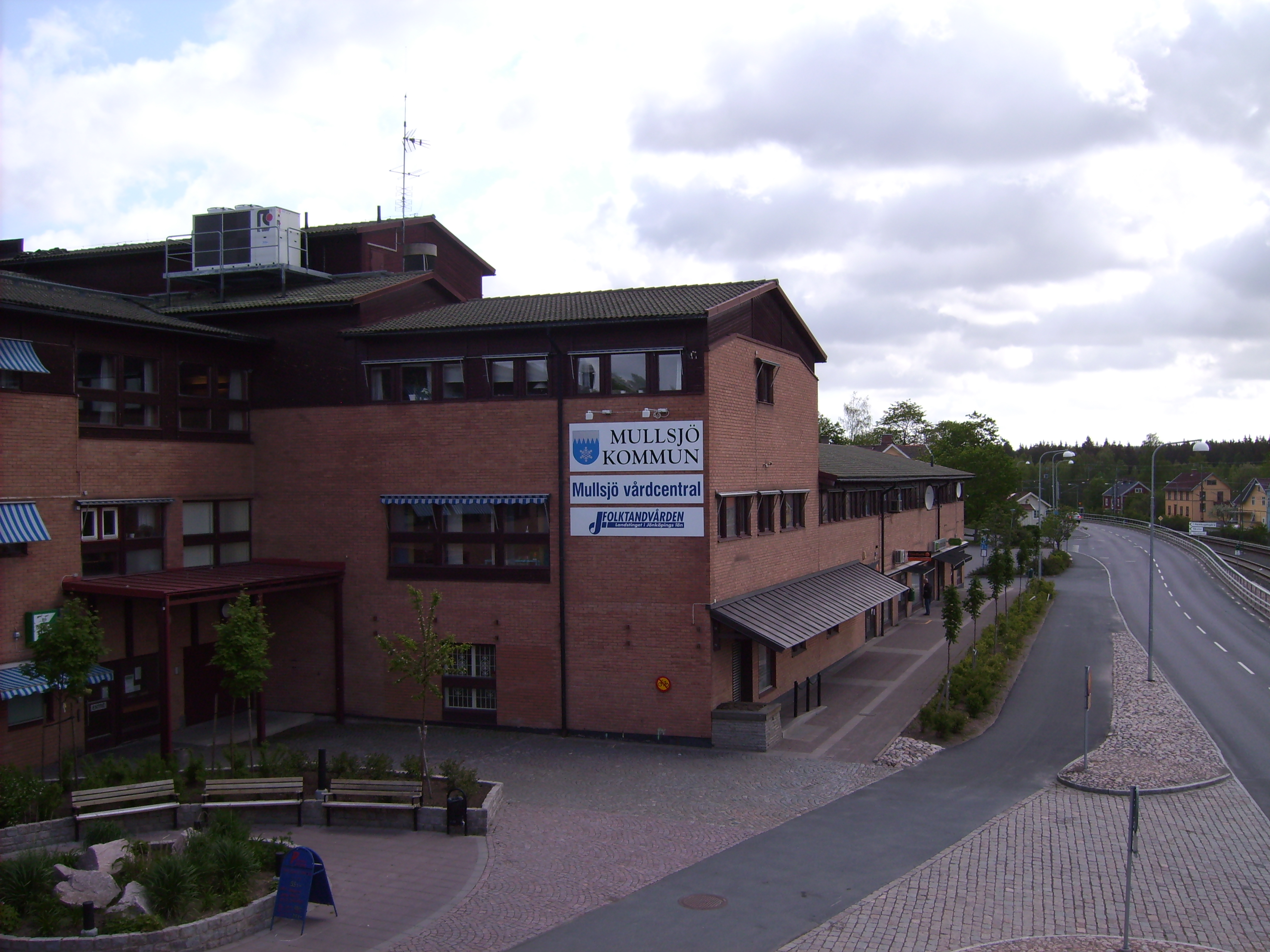
- Central Mullsjö in May 2007

- Location within Jönköping Location within Sweden
- Coordinates: 57°55′N 13°53′E
- Country: Sweden
- Province: Västergötland
- County: Jönköping County
- Municipality: Mullsjö Municipality

Area
  - Total: 5.05 km^{2} (1.95 sq mi)

Population (31 December 2010)
  - Total: 5,452
  - Density: 1,079/km^{2} (2,790/sq mi)
- Time zone: UTC+1 (CET)
  - Summer (DST): UTC+2 (CEST)
- Climate: Dfb

Mullsjö is a locality and the seat of Mullsjö Municipality, Jönköping County, Sweden with 5,452 inhabitants in 2010. Elevation: 286 metres.

== See also ==
- Mullsjö Secondary School
- Nykyrka Church
