= Lärbro Church =

- Lärbro kyrka
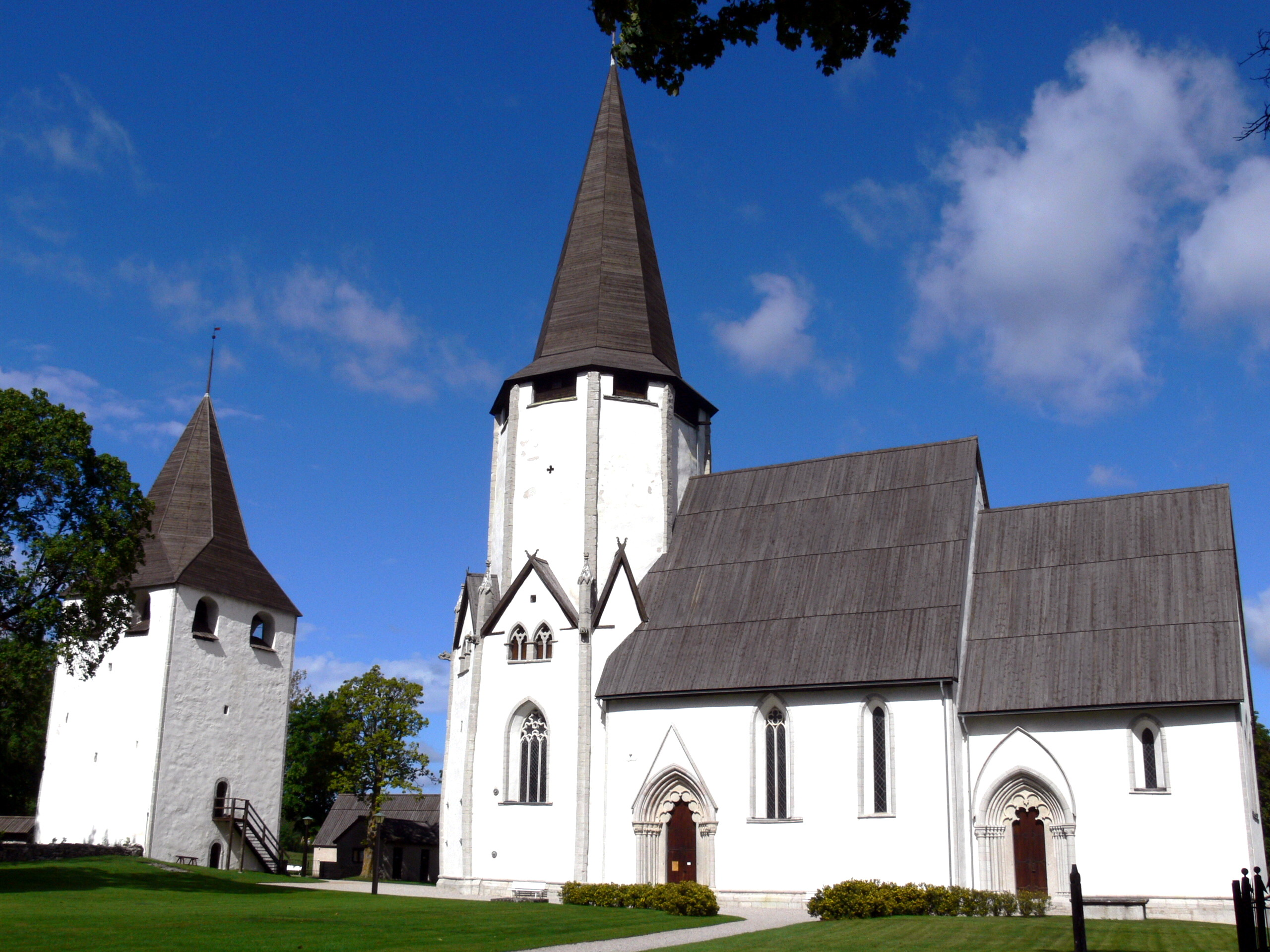
- Lärbro Church, view of the exterior and the adjacent fortified tower

- Location on Gotland Lärbro Church (Europe)
- 57°47′14″N 18°47′37″E
- Country: Sweden
- Denomination: Church of Sweden

Lärbro Church (Swedish: Lärbro kyrka) is a medieval church in Lärbro on the Swedish island of Gotland. The church is located at a former strategically important spot, as testified by the adjacent fortified tower. The presently visible Gothic church replaced an earlier Romanesque church during the 13th and 14th century. The cemetery of the church contains several graves of victims from Nazi concentration camps who were taken to a field hospital in Lärbro during and after World War II.

The octagonal church tower is one of the most unusual on the island; incomparable to other church towers outside Visby. It may have been built to house a chapel dedicated to Saint Olaf. The rest of the church is constructed in a more traditional style, similar to other churches on Gotland. It contains medieval murals and an altarpiece from around 1400, among other furnishings. The church is in the Diocese of Visby of the Church of Sweden, and classified as an ecclesiastical monument by the Swedish National Heritage Board.

== Location and surroundings ==
Lärbro Church is located in Lärbro, just west of a small valley. Archaeologists have discovered the remains of two ancient causeways connecting the two sides of the swampy valley. The location of a kastal (defensive tower) adjacent to the church can be explained by its former strategic location. The tower dates from the 11th or 12th century. It is a well-preserved, five storey tall stone tower built for defensive purposes. The ground floor and the top floor have ceilings supported by barrel vaults. On the third floor there are traces of an original dansker. The original entrance was on the ground floor. Communication between the floors was possible with a ladder, which could be pulled up from the upper floors. More recently, an external wooden staircase has been constructed which provides access to the tower through an entrance on the first floor. As of 2017, the tower is used for temporary exhibitions. Two medieval lychgates in the cemetery wall were demolished in 1885.

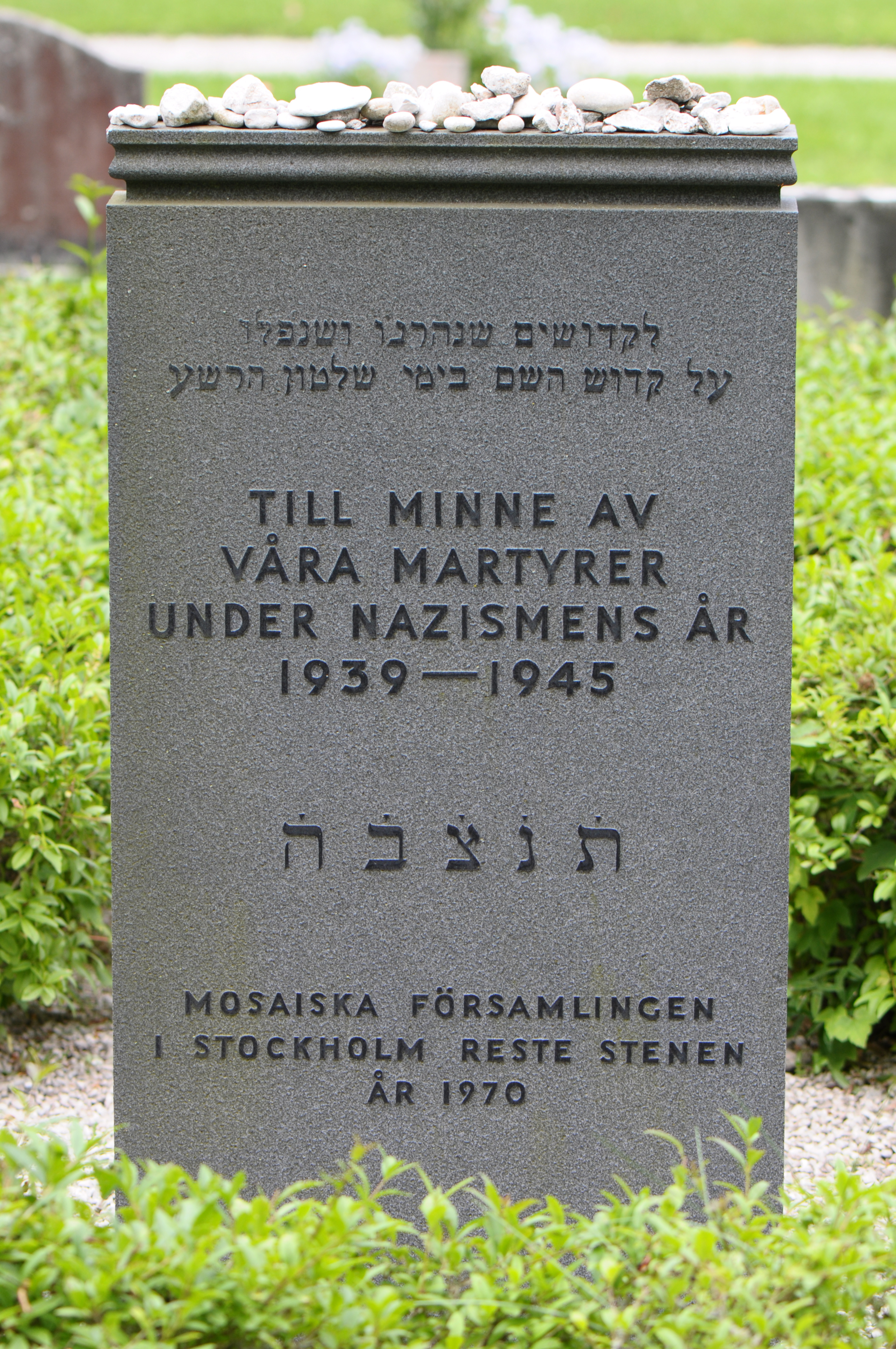
Memorial for the nine Jewish victims of The Holocaust who are buried at the cemetery.

During World War II, a field hospital was built in Lärbro. At the time of its completion in 1942 it was one of the most modern of its kind in Sweden. Since Sweden never entered the war, the field hospital never had to be used by the Swedish Armed Forces. Instead, it was used to treat sick and wounded refugees and victims of the war from the rest of Europe. Among those treated in the field hospital were refugees fleeing the occupation of the Baltic states, German soldiers and around 500 victims from the Nazi concentration camps Auschwitz and Bergen-Belsen. Some of those treated in the field hospital did not survive, and were buried in the cemetery of Lärbro Church. There are 45 graves from this time at the cemetery, including nine of Jewish victims. There is a memorial stone erected by the Jewish community in Stockholm at the cemetery, and a stone commemorating the Polish citizens who were treated at the hospital and are buried in the cemetery was inaugurated by the Polish ambassador to Sweden in 2010.

== History ==
The current church was preceded by an earlier, Romanesque stone church which consisted of a nave and a chancel with an apse, and a tower which may have been added later. It was probably built at the end of the 12th century. Some parts of this earlier church have been incorporated in the present church. This includes the present portal to the sacristy and its decorated tympanum, which was originally the chancel portal of the earlier church. A few elements of the nave, chancel and the base of the tower also remain from this first church in Lärbro.

At the end of the 13th century, a complete rebuilding of the church was initiated, resulting in the present Gothic building. The chancel and sacristy was replaced first, during the third quarter of the 13th century. The new nave was built at the end the same century. The octagonal tower was built in the 1340s. It was about 6 metres (20 ft) higher at the time of construction; the top part of the tower was severely damaged in a storm in 1522, and had to be demolished. No major alterations have been made since then. A renovation was carried out between 1953 and 1955 under the leadership of architect Olle Karth. A number of redundant buttresses supporting the tower were then removed.

== Architecture ==
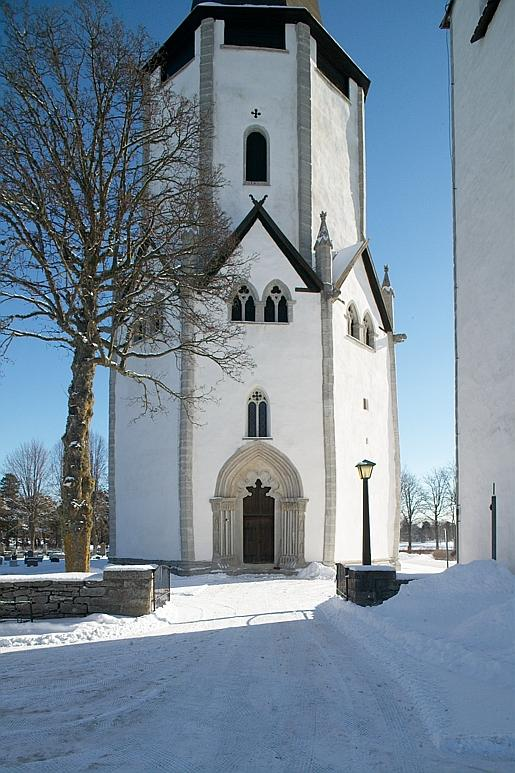
The octagonal tower, view from the west

=== Tower ===
The most unusual feature of Lärbro Church is the octagonal tower, which is also one of the most singular medieval buildings on Gotland. The only other churches on Gotland with octagonal features are the church ruin of Helgeand in Visby (from the 13th century) and the side towers of Visby Cathedral (contemporary with the tower in Lärbro). The tower appears to be the work of a workshop which was active at several churches on Gotland during the 14th century and known by the notname Egypticus. Apart from the octagonal shape, the pinnacles and gargoyles adorning the tower also appear to have Visby Cathedral as their model.

The corners of the tower are decorated with lesenes of limestone. Approximately half-way up, the tower is somewhat indented, the lower part thus being broader than the upper part. The lesenes here end in pinnacles which stand out between the gables. Under each pinnacle is a gargoyle, functioning as a water spout. All around the tower, there are pairs of pointed arch windows leading to a gallery just below the gables. The original upper part of the tower was probably similarly decorated. The wooden roof was rebuilt but probably follows the original shape. The tower has an additional two Gothic windows decorated with tracery, one in the south wall and a smaller in the west wall above the portal. The portal itself is decorated with reliefs on the outermost posts, depicting saints Peter, Paul, Olaf and a fourth unknown saint.

The capitals are decorated with sculptures depicting scenes from the life of Christ. On stylistic grounds, it has been suggested that the sculptor who made them also made the capitals at the chancel portals of Lummelunda and Hablingbo churches. The ground floor of the tower is covered by an eight-celled vault and lit by the large windows, creating a light and relatively lavish room, in contrast to most other churches on Gotland. It gives less the impression of being an anteroom and could be described as the focal point of the whole church. In one of the upper floors of the tower, the same eight-celled vault appears again. Unusually, the original wooden scaffolding used by the medieval builders has also been preserved there.

It is not known why the tower was built in this way. The most prevalent theory is that it was used as a chapel dedicated to Saint Olaf. A local legend connects the saint with the area around Lärbro, and as noted a sculpture of the saint also features on the tower portal. The shape of the tower could then possibly be a reference to the octagonal chapel in Nidaros Cathedral in Trondheim, Norway, where the relics of the saint are kept.

=== Nave and chancel ===
In contrast to the tower, the nave and chancel are typical for medieval churches on Gotland. They appear to have been conceived in a single plan, even though they were built at slightly different times. The chancel is also stylistically closely related to the tower at Stenkyrka Church. It has a straight eastern wall and a group of three lancet windows, a common feature among the churches on Gotland. The nave receives light from two Gothic windows in the south wall and one in the north wall. Its portal is decorated with floral ornamentation and a single figure, again possibly depicting Saint Olaf. It is made of alternating grey and reddish limestone. The chancel portal is also decorated with purely ornamental elements. Inside, the nave is divided by two central pillars, constructed of alternating red and grey limestone, and six corbels into six bays.

== Murals and furnishings ==
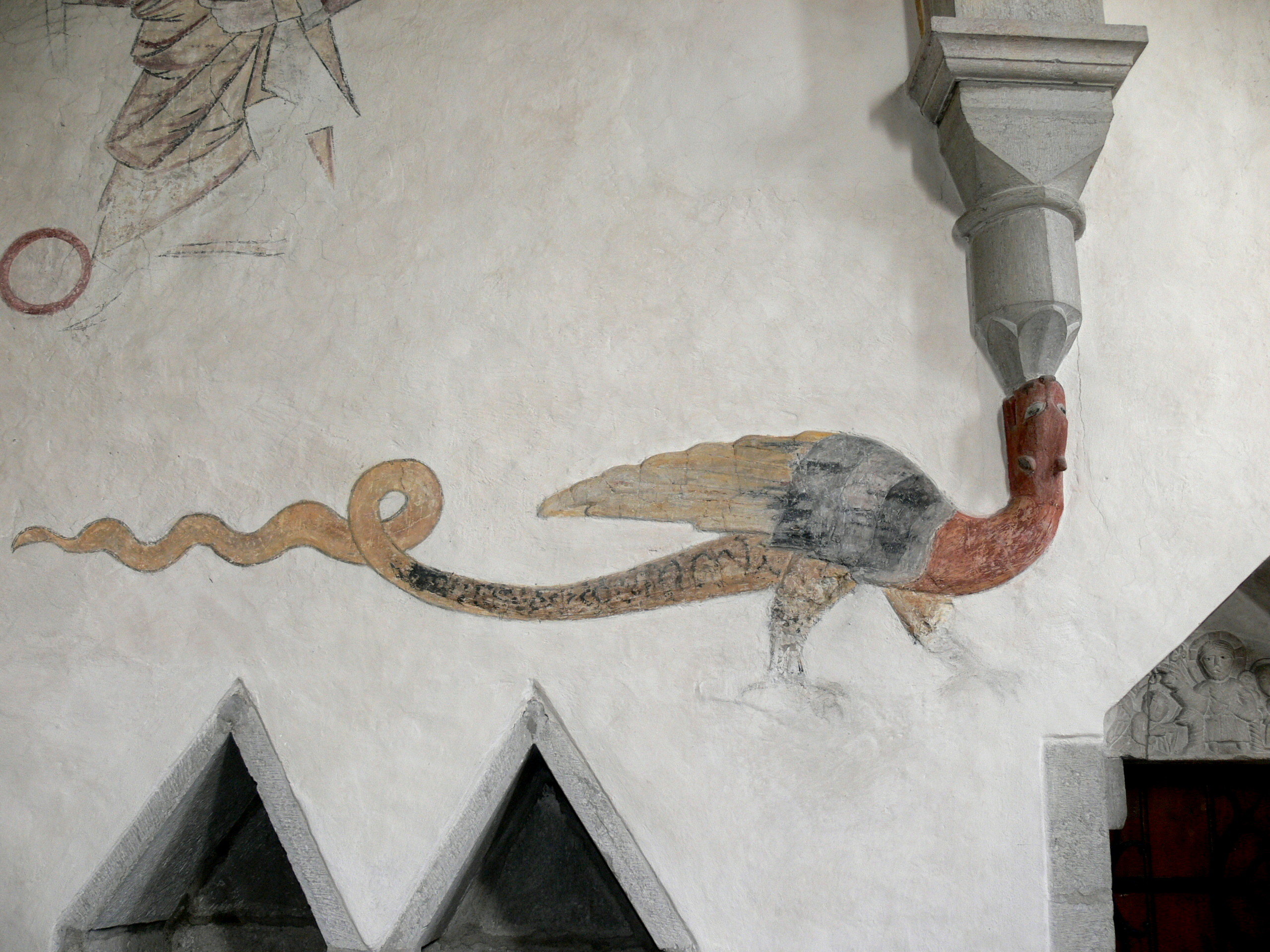
Medieval mural depicting a dragon which also incorporates one of the corbels.

Lärbro Church is decorated with a set of medieval murals, dating from the construction period of the church. They decorate the nave and chancel, where some of them have incorporated architectural details in the composition, an uncommon feature among church murals in Sweden. As an example, a corbel has been used to form the head of a painted dragon. Other murals are purely ornamental, and some also depict more traditional religious subjects such as the Crucifixion and saints.

The altarpiece of the church is from the late 14th century or c. 1400, depicting Mary and the Twelve Apostles. It was altered in 1746 when many of the wooden statuettes were mixed up and marked with incorrect labels. The 124 centimetres (49 in) tall and 186 centimetres (73 in) wide altarpiece is similar to the one in Gammelgarn Church and probably made in Sweden. The church also possesses a chair made of lathed wooden elements, dating from the 13th century. There are also a number of medieval tombstones in the floor of the church. The baptismal font of the church, decorated with festoons, is made of sandstone and dates from the end of the 17th century. The pulpit is from 1718, and the pews are probably from the same period. The church organ is from 1955; the tower room also has an organ from 1819.

== Use and heritage status ==
Lärbro Church belongs to Forsa parish within Nordertredingens kontrakt, (Note: A "kontrakt" within the Church of Sweden is approximately equivalent to a rural deanery.) itself part of the Diocese of Visby within the Church of Sweden. Lärbro Church is an ecclesiastical monument, number 21300000002813 (sub-number: 21400000444059) in the buildings database of the Swedish National Heritage Board. In 2019, Lärbro Church was one of the first 56 cultural heritage monuments on Gotland and in Sweden to be explicitly marked with the blue and white shield of the Hague Convention for the Protection of Cultural Property in the Event of Armed Conflict.

== Bibliography ==
- Andrén, Anders (2017). Det Medeltida Gotland. En arkeologisk guidebok [Medieval Gotland. An archaeological guidebook] (in Swedish) (2 ed.). Lund: Historiska Media. ISBN 978-91-7545-476-4.
- Jacobsson, Britta; Johansson, Eva; Johansson, Per; Andersson, Rolf (1990). Våra kyrkor [Our churches] (in Swedish). Västervik: Klarkullens förlag AB. ISBN 91-971561-08.
- Lagerlöf, Erland (1975). Gotländsk stenskulptur från gotiken. En stenhuggarverkstad på 1300-talet [Gothic stone sculpture from Gotland. A stone sculptor workshop from the 14th century] (in Swedish). Stockholm: Rabén & Sjögren. ISBN 91-29-43995-7.
- Lagerlöf, Erland; Svahnström, Gunnar (1991). Gotlands kyrkor [Churches of Gotland] (in Swedish) (4th ed.). Stockholm: Rabén & Sjögren. ISBN 91-29-61598-4.
- Ullén, Marian (1996). "Gotikens kyrkobyggande" [Church building during the Gothic era]. In Augustsson, Jan-Erik (ed.). Signums svenska konsthistoria. Den gotiska konsten [Signum's history of Swedish art. Gothic art] (in Swedish). Lund: Signum. pp. 37–134. ISBN 91-87896-23-0.
- Wollin, Nils. G. (1935). Lärbro kyrka [Lärbro Church] (PDF). Sveriges kyrkor, konsthistoriskt inventarium (in Swedish). Vol. 42. Stockholm: Generalstabens Litografiska Ansltalts Förlag. pp. 92–115. ISSN 0284-1894.
