= Saint Lars church ruin, Visby =

Saint Lars Church Ruin
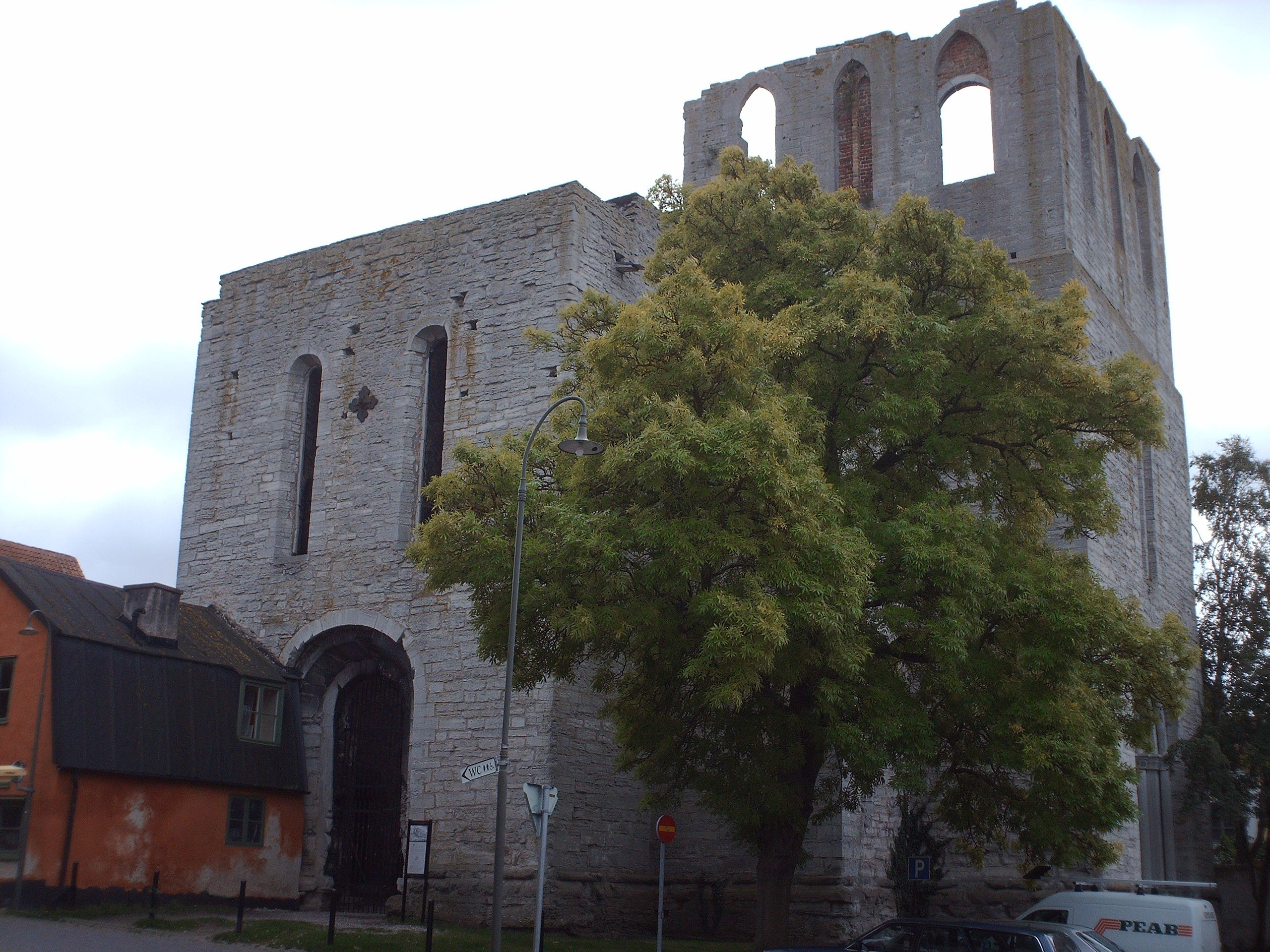
- Sankt Lars kyrkoruin
- Saint Lars Church Ruin
- 57°38′28.99″N 18°17′42.12″E
- Location: Visby, Gotland
- Country: Sweden

History
- Founded: 13th century

Architecture
- Functional status: Ruin
- Heritage designation: Preservation order

Saint Lars Church ruin (Swedish: Sankt Lars kyrkoruin) is located in the central part of Visby on the island of Gotland, Sweden.

== History ==
The church has been named after Saint Lawrence (225–258), one of the seven deacons of the city of Rome, Italy under Pope Sixtus II. Saint Lars Church was established probably around 1210-1220 as a Visby parish church as a result of the population increase in Gotland. Construction of the church began during the second quarter of the 12th century, with the choir being the oldest part of the building.

St. Drotten's Church was built adjacent to Saint Lars Church around 1240 as the German language parish church in Visby. Both churches were abandoned in connection with the Reformation in Sweden which King Gustav Vasa carried out in the 1530s.

In purely architectural terms, Saint Lars differs in its form from other Visby churches. It was probably inspired by Byzantine architecture while the other churches in Visby were similar to the German church style.

== Gallery ==
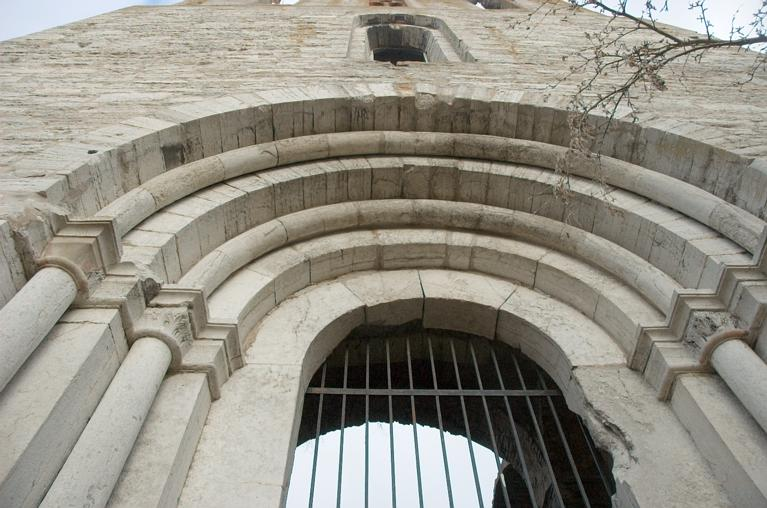

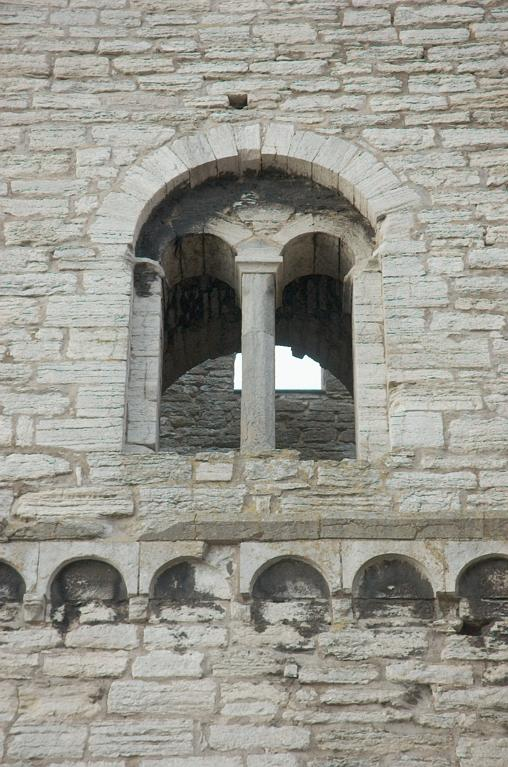

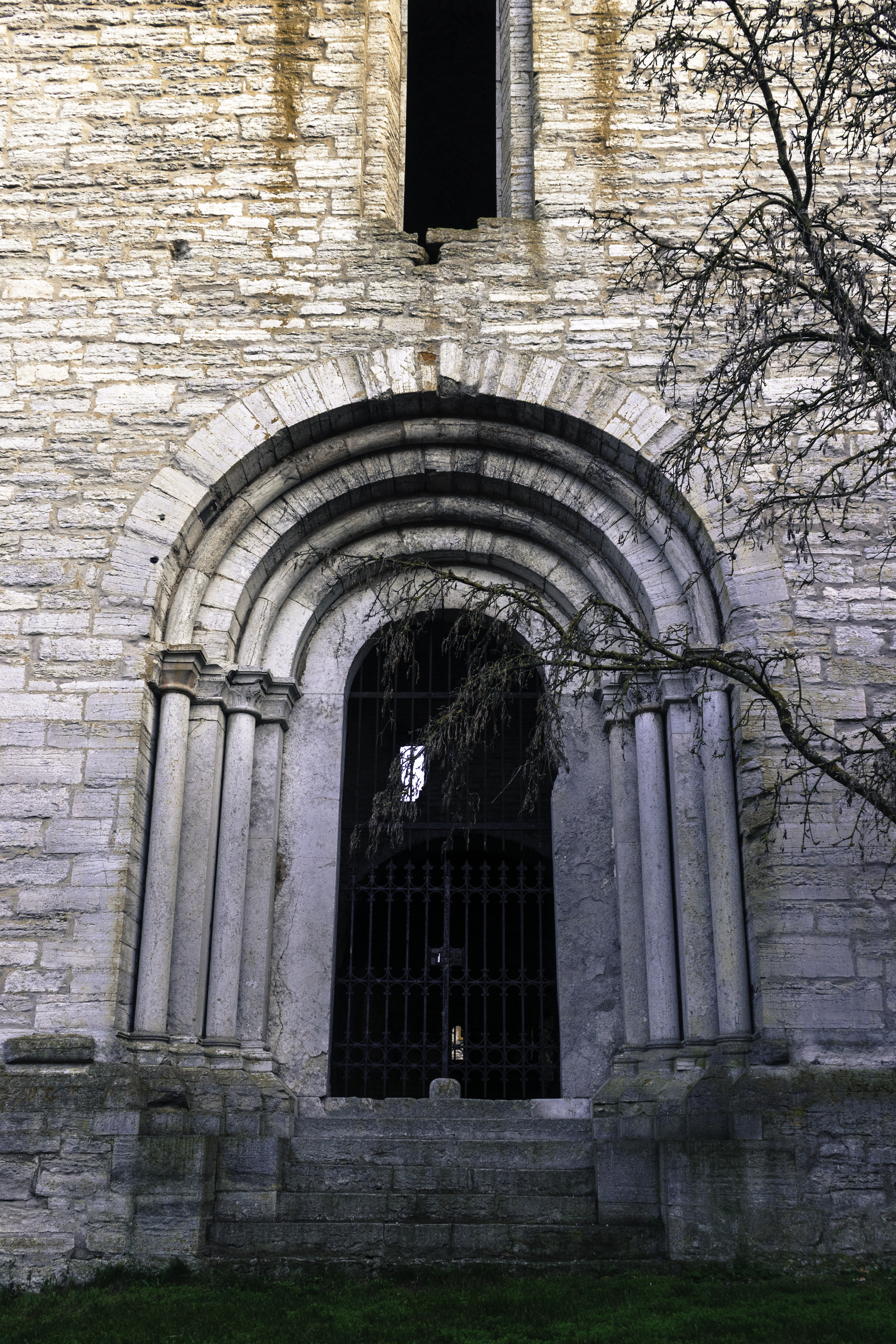

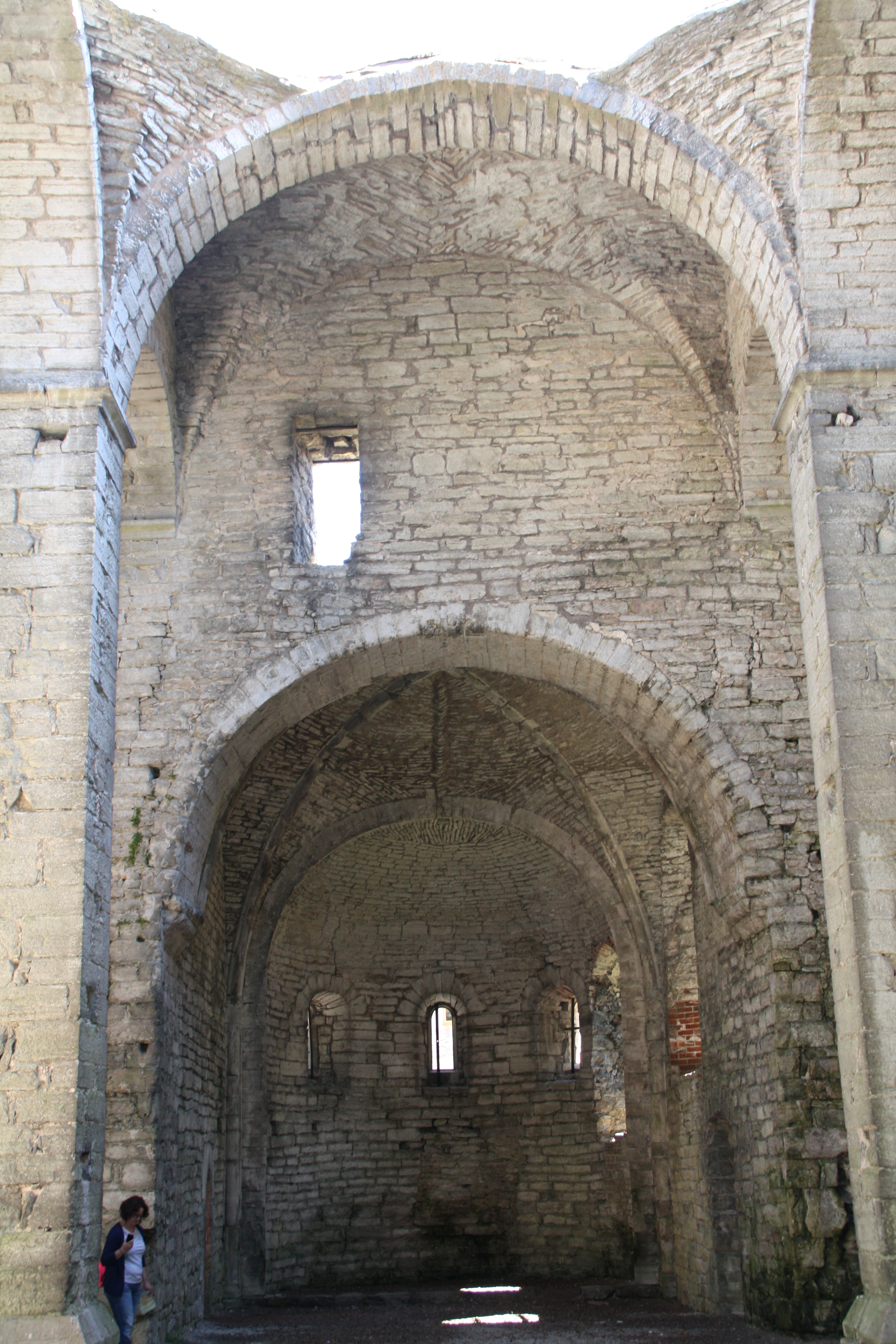

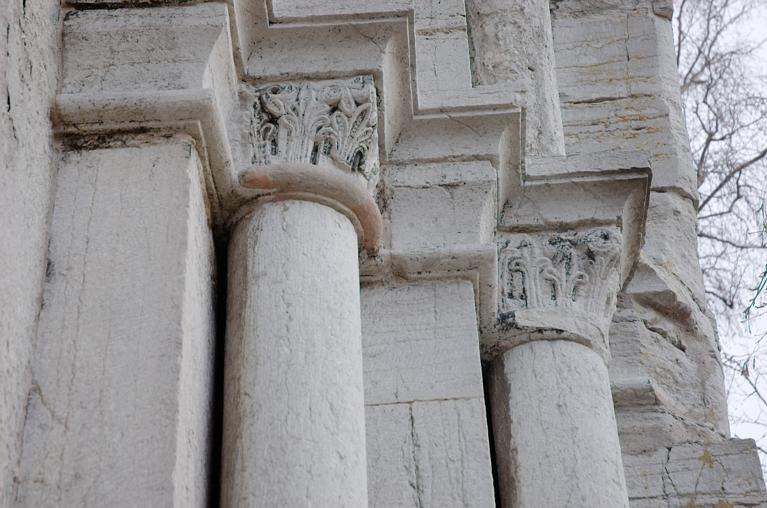

== See also ==
- List of church ruins on Gotland

== Other Sources ==
- Lagerlöf, Erland, ed. (1973) Gotlands kyrkor (Uddevalla: Rabén & Sjögren) ISBN 9129410355
- Svahnström, Gunnar (1985) Kyrkorna i Visby ( Stockholm: Svenska kulturminnen) ISBN 9171926496

== Related reading ==
- Svensson, Britta (1998) Guide to Visby (Uppsala: Almqvist & Wiksell Tryckeri) ISBN 91-88036-27-8
- Marita Jonsson & Sven-Olof Lindqvist (1997) Gateway to Gotland (Uppsala: Almqvist & Wiksell Tryckeri) ISBN 91-88036-23-5
- Roberts, Michael (1968) The Early Vasas: A History of Sweden, 1523-1611 (Cambridge University Press) ISBN 9781001296982
