= Hangvar Church =

- Hangvar kyrka
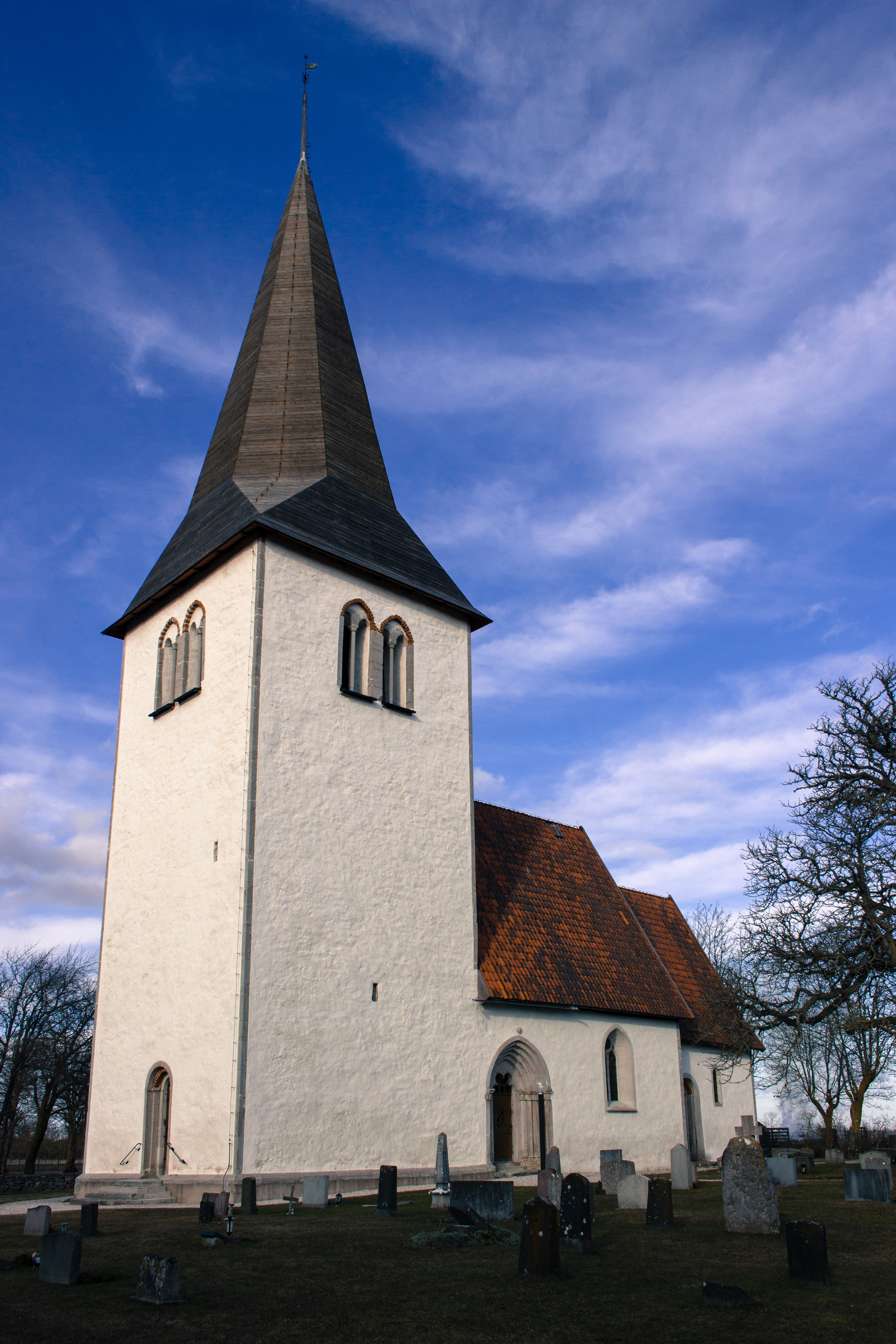
- Hangvar Church, view of the exterior

- Location on Gotland
- 57°50′21″N 18°41′19″E
- Country: Sweden
- Denomination: Church of Sweden

Administration
- Diocese: Visby

Hangvar Church (Swedish: Hangvar kyrka) is a medieval church in Hangvar on the Swedish island of Gotland. It is part of the Diocese of Visby.

== History and architecture ==
The church dates from the 13th century. The oldest parts are the choir and nave; the tower was built slightly later. The church has a decorated entrance portal, with sculpted capitals and a sculpture of a man's head above the portal. Internally, the church ceiling is supported by four vaults which rest on a central column. The base of the column is decorated with carved figures. Among the furnishings, the baptismal font is medieval, dating from circa 1250. The church has originally been decorated with six wooden sculptures dating from the Middle Ages but these are now displayed in the Gotland Museum in Visby. The altarpiece, made of wood, dates from 1684, while the pulpit is from 1633.
