= Ireviken =

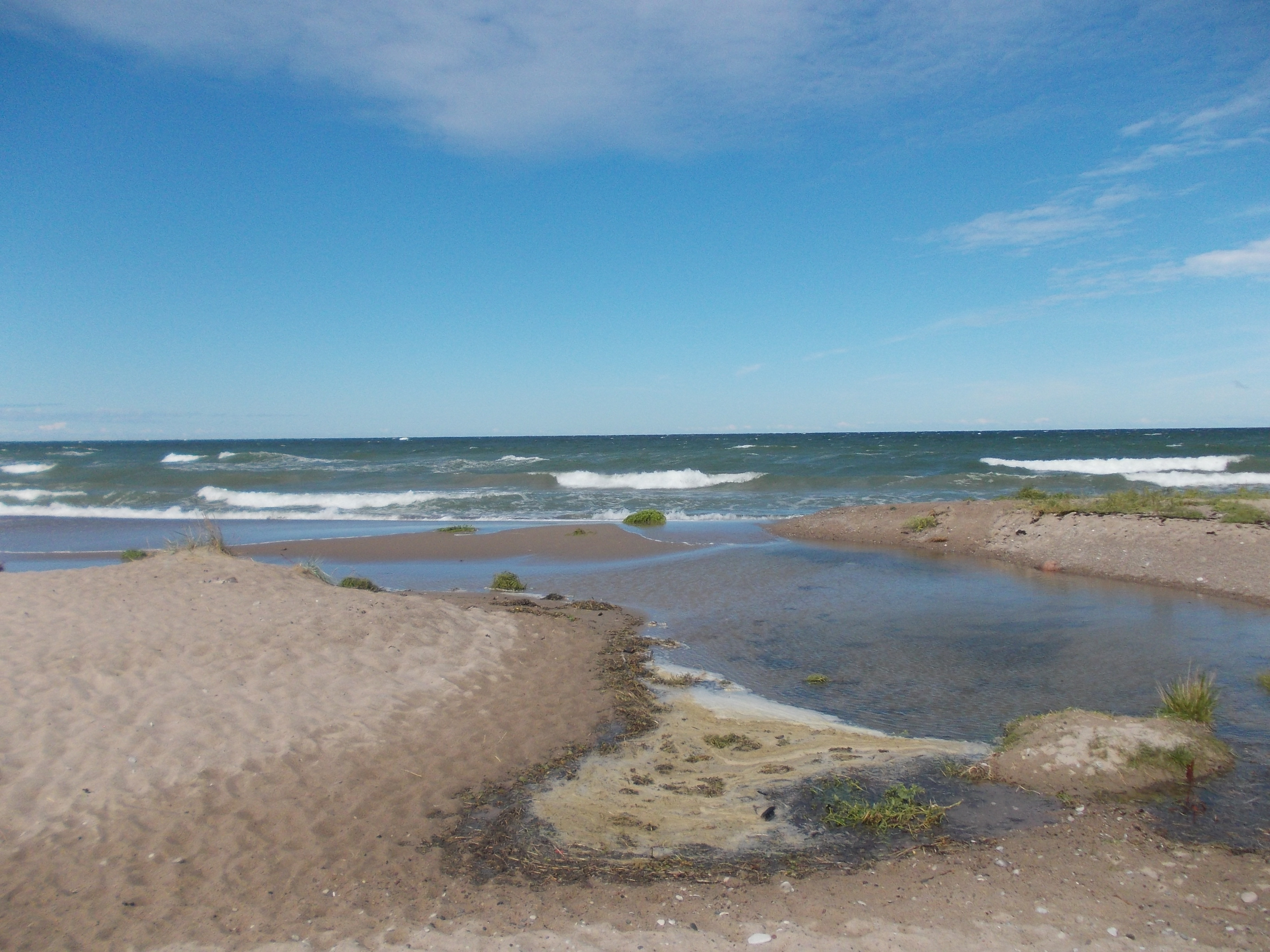
- Ireviken

- Location within Gotland Location within Sweden
- Country: Sweden
- Province: Gotland
- County: Gotland County
- Municipality: Gotland Municipality
- Time zone: UTC+1 (CET)
  - Summer (DST): UTC+2 (CEST)
- Website: www.ireviken.se

Irevik (also known as Ireviken or Ihreviken ) in Hangvar socken 5 kilometres (3 miles) north of Visby, is a more than 2-kilometre-long (1 mi) section of the Swedish island Gotland's coastline.

== History ==
There are several settlements from Stone and Bronze Ages. There are also remains of ancient castles on the cliffs.

=== The Ihre family ===
Ihre farm is located at the exit road down to the bay from the country road. The first known owner of the farm was named Hans Eire. His grandson Thomas Ihre moved to Lund from Visby to finally become a judge in Linköping.

== Geology ==
The Ireviken event was the first of three relatively minor extinction events (the Ireviken, Mulde, and Lau events) during the Silurian period. The event is best recorded at Ireviken, Gotland, where over 50% of trilobite species became extinct.

== Beach and nature ==
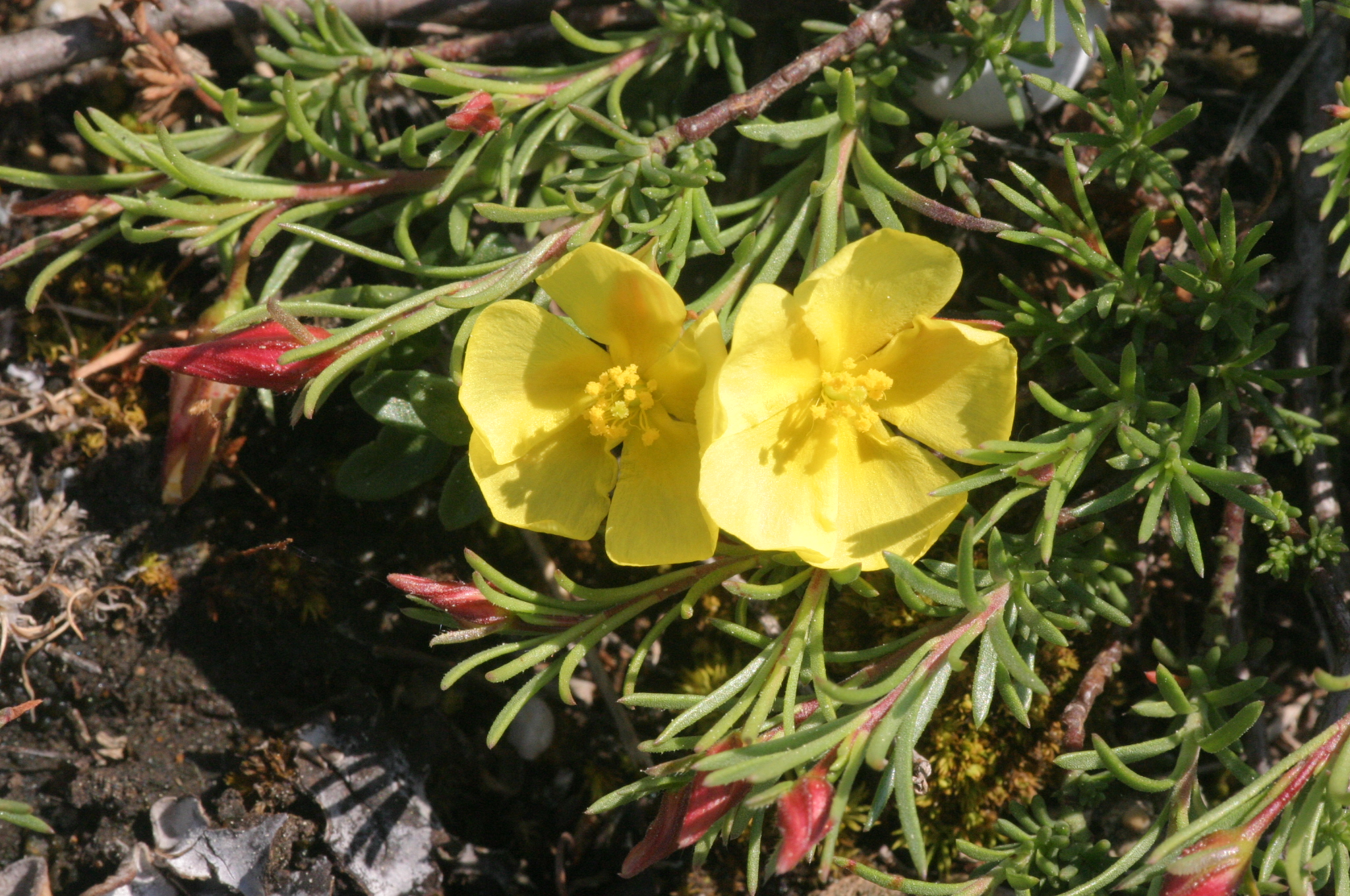
Fumana procumbens

The bay is framed by high cliffs and the beach is also considered one of Gotland's best beaches. In the middle is a long sandy beach which is one of Gotland's most visited. The river Ireån opens into the bay.

Formerly a fishing village, Irevik is mainly a summer cottage area, and nearly 200 cottages are on mature forest sites. The houses have been built for a long time, and the area therefore has a mixed character without a hint of mass-produced cottage area. Although the area is not very large, there are three different entertainment establishments – the Ihrebaden, Ihre farm and Ihre mill.

In the northern part of Irevik lies Sigsarve beach. It is also the starting point of the 28-square-kilometer Hall-Hangvar Nature Reserve, which is Gotland's largest. From Sigsarve beach, the reserve stretches along a 25 km (16 mi) stretch of coastline. In the eastern part of the reserve, on the other side of the road, is Träskmyr moor, the largest preserved moor on Gotland. It is a so-called agmyr (Swedish for a calcareous bog. There are many unusual flowers in the reserve, such as the Fumana or needle sunrose (Fumana procumbens), Euphrasia and alpine key.

== Climate ==
According to the Köppen climate classification, Irevik has an oceanic climate. This renders cooler summers and milder winters than most of mainland Sweden. However, in spite of its marine position the climate is very much influenced by continental airflows. The precipitation amount is quite moderated, especially for an oceanic climate, but is relatively consistent throughout the year.

Climate data for Irevik (2002–2018 averages, extremes since 1901)
| Month | Jan | Feb | Mar | Apr | May | Jun | Jul | Aug | Sep | Oct | Nov | Dec | Year |
|---|---|---|---|---|---|---|---|---|---|---|---|---|---|
| Record high °C (°F) | 10.2 (50.4) | 12.2 (54.0) | 18.6 (65.5) | 25.2 (77.4) | 27.7 (81.9) | 31.4 (88.5) | 33.7 (92.7) | 32.9 (91.2) | 29.0 (84.2) | 20.9 (69.6) | 13.5 (56.3) | 12.5 (54.5) | 33.7 (92.7) |
| Mean maximum °C (°F) | 6.6 (43.9) | 6.4 (43.5) | 11.8 (53.2) | 18.0 (64.4) | 24.0 (75.2) | 25.8 (78.4) | 28.2 (82.8) | 27.3 (81.1) | 22.7 (72.9) | 16.2 (61.2) | 11.0 (51.8) | 8.0 (46.4) | 29.1 (84.4) |
| Mean daily maximum °C (°F) | 1.5 (34.7) | 1.4 (34.5) | 4.4 (39.9) | 10.1 (50.2) | 15.7 (60.3) | 19.1 (66.4) | 22.1 (71.8) | 21.3 (70.3) | 17.1 (62.8) | 10.9 (51.6) | 6.7 (44.1) | 3.7 (38.7) | 11.2 (52.1) |
| Daily mean °C (°F) | −0.6 (30.9) | −0.8 (30.6) | 1.1 (34.0) | 5.6 (42.1) | 10.7 (51.3) | 14.6 (58.3) | 17.9 (64.2) | 17.3 (63.1) | 13.6 (56.5) | 8.2 (46.8) | 4.7 (40.5) | 1.8 (35.2) | 7.8 (46.1) |
| Mean daily minimum °C (°F) | −2.6 (27.3) | −3.0 (26.6) | −2.3 (27.9) | 1.1 (34.0) | 5.7 (42.3) | 10.1 (50.2) | 13.6 (56.5) | 13.3 (55.9) | 10.0 (50.0) | 5.4 (41.7) | 2.7 (36.9) | −0.2 (31.6) | 4.5 (40.1) |
| Mean minimum °C (°F) | −13.3 (8.1) | −11.3 (11.7) | −11.3 (11.7) | −5.8 (21.6) | −1.6 (29.1) | 3.3 (37.9) | 7.8 (46.0) | 6.7 (44.1) | 3.5 (38.3) | −2.2 (28.0) | −4.1 (24.6) | −8.5 (16.7) | −13.3 (8.1) |
| Record low °C (°F) | −25.0 (−13.0) | −25.4 (−13.7) | −23.5 (−10.3) | −12.7 (9.1) | −7.8 (18.0) | −1.0 (30.2) | 2.9 (37.2) | 1.1 (34.0) | −2.9 (26.8) | −6.0 (21.2) | −11.5 (11.3) | −22.2 (−8.0) | −25.4 (−13.7) |
| Average precipitation mm (inches) | 47.4 (1.87) | 28.1 (1.11) | 23.3 (0.92) | 21.8 (0.86) | 27.4 (1.08) | 40.7 (1.60) | 63.8 (2.51) | 60.3 (2.37) | 39.4 (1.55) | 55.9 (2.20) | 60.7 (2.39) | 56.4 (2.22) | 525.2 (20.68) |
| Mean monthly sunshine hours | 36 | 67 | 168 | 255 | 322 | 329 | 315 | 261 | 200 | 104 | 43 | 32 | 2,132 |
Source 1:
Source 2:
