= Hall, Gotland =

Hall
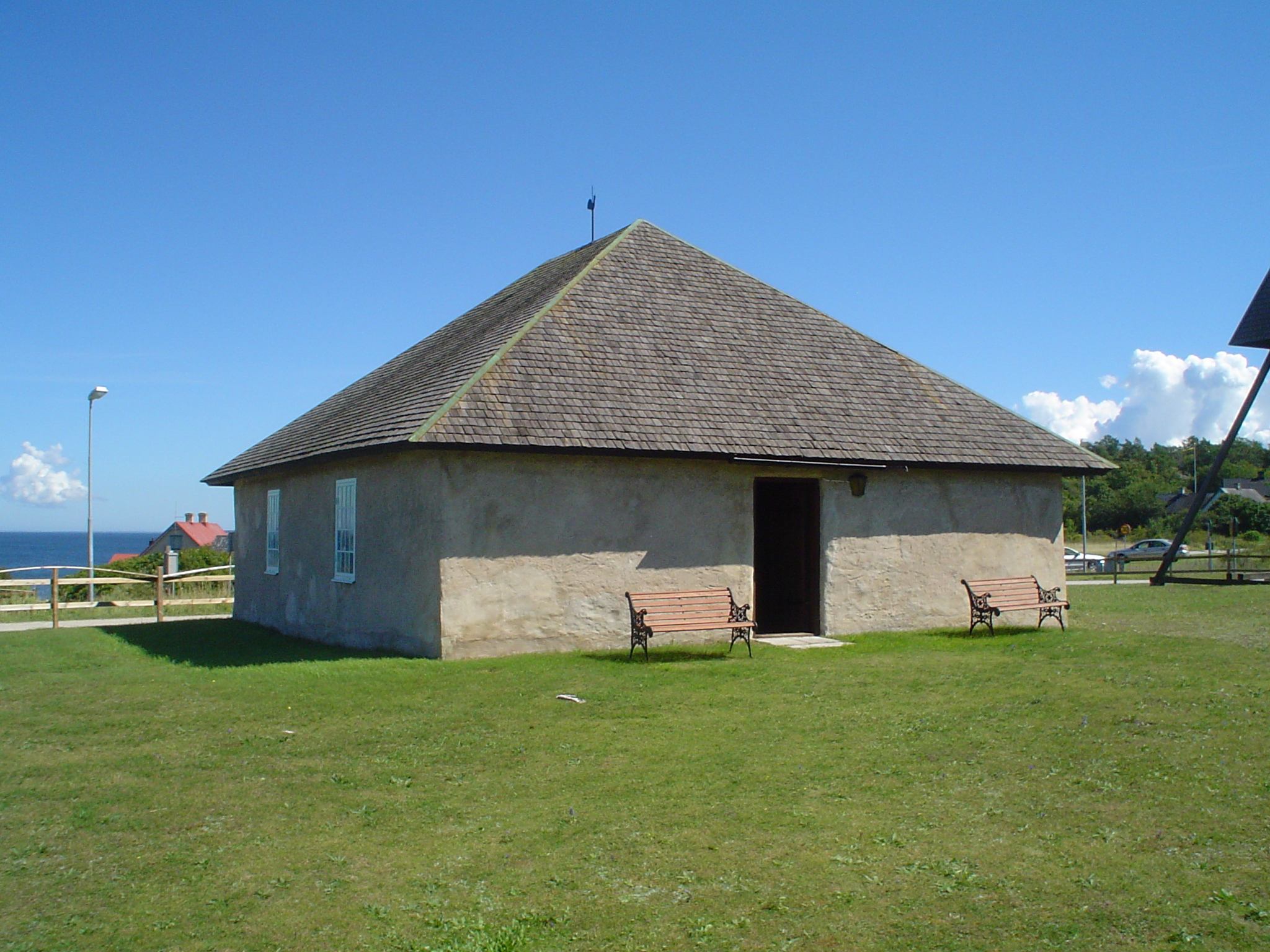
- Hallshuk fishermen chapel in Hall

- Location within Gotland
- Coordinates: 57°53′31″N 18°42′57″E
- Country: Sweden
- Province: Gotland
- County: Gotland County
- Municipality: Gotland Municipality

Area
  - Total: 34.29 km^{2} (13.24 sq mi)

Population (2014)
  - Total: 53
- Time zone: UTC+1 (CET)
  - Summer (DST): UTC+2 (CEST)

Hall is a populated area, a socken (not to be confused with parish), on the Swedish island of Gotland. It comprises the same area as the administrative Hall District, established on 1 January 2016.

== Geography ==
Hall is situated on the north coast of Gotland. The medieval Hall Church is located in the socken. On the coast is also Hallshuk, sometimes called Hall, fishing village with the Hallshuk Chapel, built by Queen Christina in 1645, to be used by the fishermen working in the area. As of 2019, Hall Church and Hallshuk Chapel belongs to Forsa parish in Norra Gotlands pastorat, along with the churches in Lärbro, Hellvi and Hangvar.

Along the northwest and north coast of Hall is the Hall-Hangvar nature reserve. The reserve is the largest on Gotland, covering an area of 28 km^{2} (11 mi^{2}). The reserve was established in 1967 and expanded in 1999.
