= Hangvar =

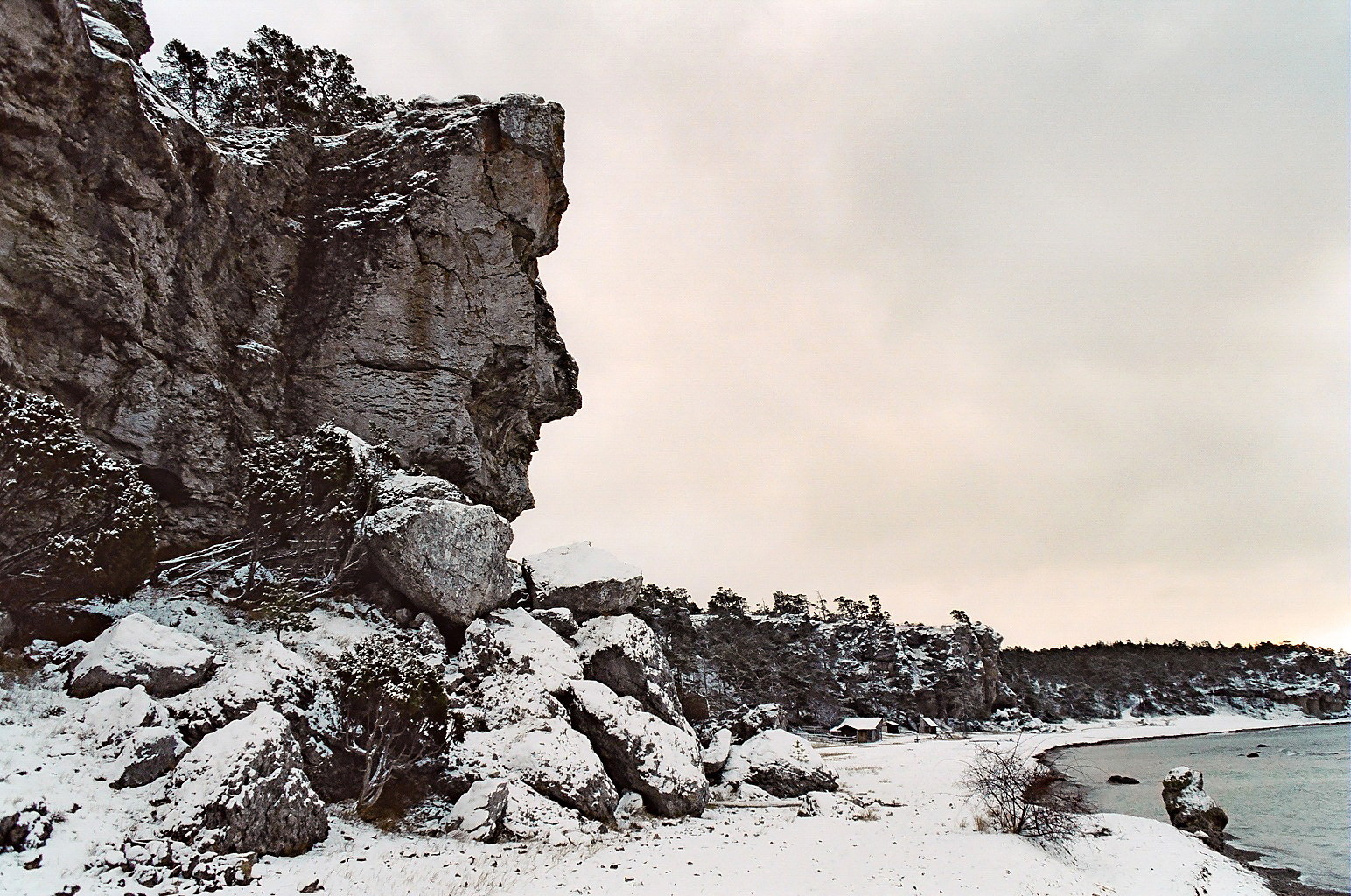
- Sigsarve beach in Hangvar

- Location within Gotland
- Coordinates: 57°50′21″N 18°41′18″E
- Country: Sweden
- Province: Gotland
- County: Gotland County
- Municipality: Gotland Municipality

Area
  - Total: 84.18 km^{2} (32.50 sq mi)

Population (2014)
  - Total: 344
- Time zone: UTC+1 (CET)
  - Summer (DST): UTC+2 (CEST)

Hangvar (Swedish pronunciation: [ˈhâŋːvɑːr]) is a populated area, a socken (not to be confused with parish), on the Swedish island of Gotland. It comprises the same area as the administrative Hangvar District, established on 1 January 2016.

Hangvar is the home of football club Hangvar SK.

== Geography ==
Hangvar is the name of the socken as well as the district. It is also the name of the small village surrounding the medieval Hangvar Church, sometimes referred to as Hangvar kyrkby. It is situated across the northern tip of Gotland. As of 2019, Hangvar Church belongs to Forsa parish in Norra Gotlands pastorat, along with the churches in Lärbro, Hellvi, Hall and Hallshuk.

Located on the west coast of Hangvar are the Sigsarve beach and fishing site, as well as Ireviken (or Irevik or Ihreviken), a former fishing village now a small holiday resort and community. Along the west coast of Hangvar is the Hall-Hangvar nature reserve. The reserve is the largest on Gotland, covering an area of 28 km^{2} (11 mi^{2}). The reserve was established in 1967 and expanded in 1999.
