= Hall Church, Gotland =

Hall Church
- Halls kyrka
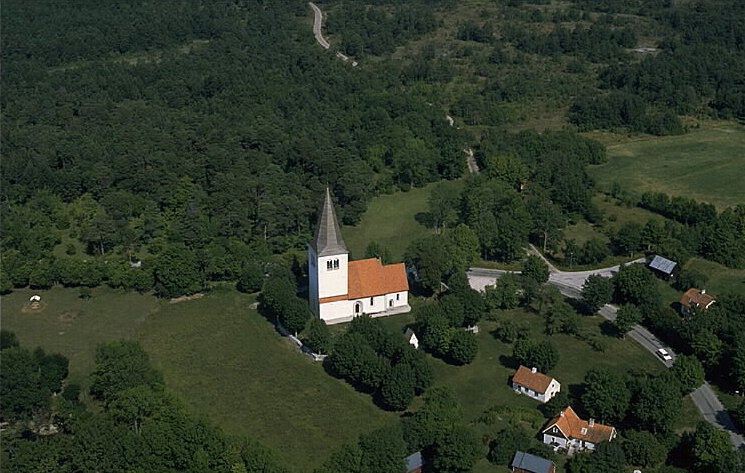
- Aerial view of Hall Church

- Location on Gotland
- 57°53′32″N 18°42′57″E
- Country: Sweden
- Denomination: Church of Sweden

Administration
- Diocese: Visby

Hall Church (Swedish: Halls kyrka) is a 13th-century church in Hall on the Swedish island of Gotland, built in a transitional style between Romanesque and Gothic. Is lies in the Diocese of Visby.

== History and architecture ==
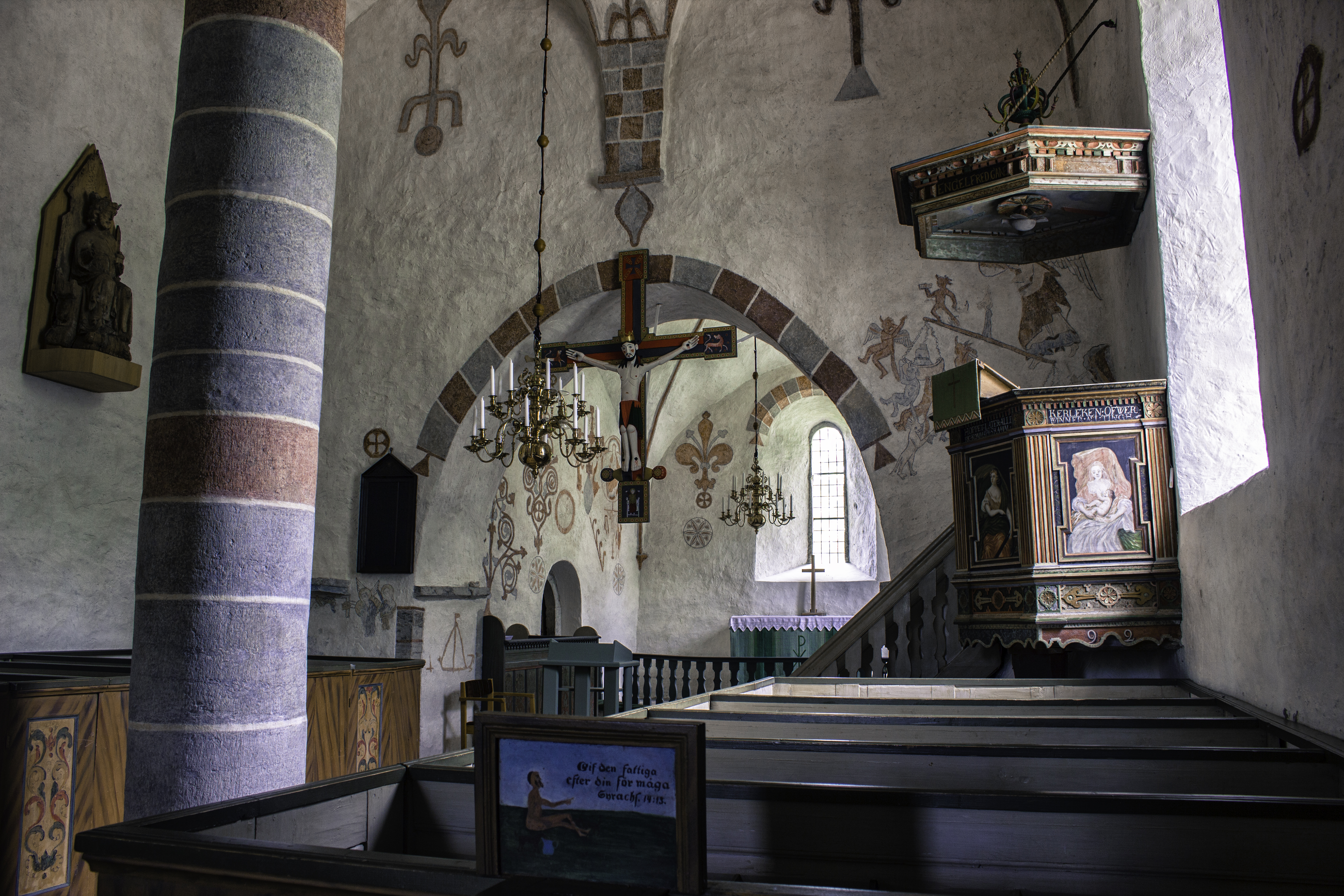
Interior, view towards the choir

Hall Church dates in its entirety from the 13th century. Oldest are the nave and choir, built in the second quarter of the century. The tower is somewhat later. Stylistically it is transitional between Romanesque and Gothic architecture.

Inside, the church is decorated with murals that were uncovered during a renovation in 1956. The murals on the northern wall of the choir are from the 14th century and depict the tree of life, Mary with Christ, Christ on the cross and Christ in a mandorla. The murals on the southern wall date from 1603 and depict two men in Renaissance clothes kneeling by Christ on the cross. In the nave, additional paintings from the 14th century exist, depicting the Coronation of the Virgin and the weighing of souls.

The triumphal cross is a copy of the original, today found in the Museum of Gotland in Visby. The original, from the 12th century, is supposedly one of the oldest wooden sculptures with still original paint in Europe. Most other furnishings are from post-Reformation times. So for example are the pews from the 17th and 18th centuries, the pulpit from 1619 and an epitaph for Elisabeth Persdotter Lythe (who died in 1652). The church has a votive ship from 1871.
