= Hangvar SK =

Swedish football club

- Full name: Hangvar Sportklubb
- Ground: Skogsgläntan; Hangvar; Gotland; Sweden
- Chairman: Johan Bengtsson
- Head coach: Thage Söderdahl
- Coach: Susanne Hedlund
- League: Division 4 Gotland

Hangvar SK is a Swedish football club located in Hangvar on the island of Gotland.

== Background ==
Hangvar SK currently plays in Division 4 Gotland which is the sixth tier of Swedish football. They play their home matches at the Skogsgläntan in Hangvar.

The club is affiliated to Gotlands Fotbollförbund. Hangvar SK have competed in the Svenska Cupen on 5 occasions and have played 6 matches in the competition.

== Season to season ==
Season	Level	Division	Section	Position	Movements
1999	Tier 5	Division 4	Gotland	2nd	Vårserier (Spring Series)
	Tier 5	Division 4	Uppland/Gotland Höstserien	7th	Höstserier (Autumn Series)
2000	Tier 5	Division 4	Gotland Vår	5th	Vårserier (Spring Series)
	Tier 5	Division 4	Gotland Höst	3rd	Höstserier (Autumn Series)
2001	Tier 5	Division 4	Gotland Vår	6th	Vårserier (Spring Series)
	Tier 5	Division 4	Gotland	2nd	Slutspel B (Playoff B)
2002	Tier 5	Division 4	Gotland	5th	
2003	Tier 5	Division 4	Gotland	2nd	
2004	Tier 5	Division 4	Gotland	5th	
2005	Tier 5	Division 4	Gotland	6th	
2006*	Tier 6	Division 4	Gotland	6th	
2007	Tier 6	Division 4	Gotland	7th	Relegation Playoffs
2008	Tier 6	Division 4	Gotland	7th	
2009	Tier 6	Division 4	Gotland	5th	
2010	Tier 6	Division 4	Gotland	6th	
2011	Tier 6	Division 4	Gotland	6th	
2012	Tier 6	Division 4	Gotland	7th	Relegation Playoffs
2013	Tier 7	Division 5	Gotland	1st	Promoted
2014	Tier 6	Division 4	Gotland	3rd	
2015	Tier 6	Division 4	Gotland	5th	

* League restructuring in 2006 resulted in a new division being created at Tier 3 and subsequent divisions dropping a level.
