= Gann Church =

Coordinates: 57°47′46″N 18°45′06″E

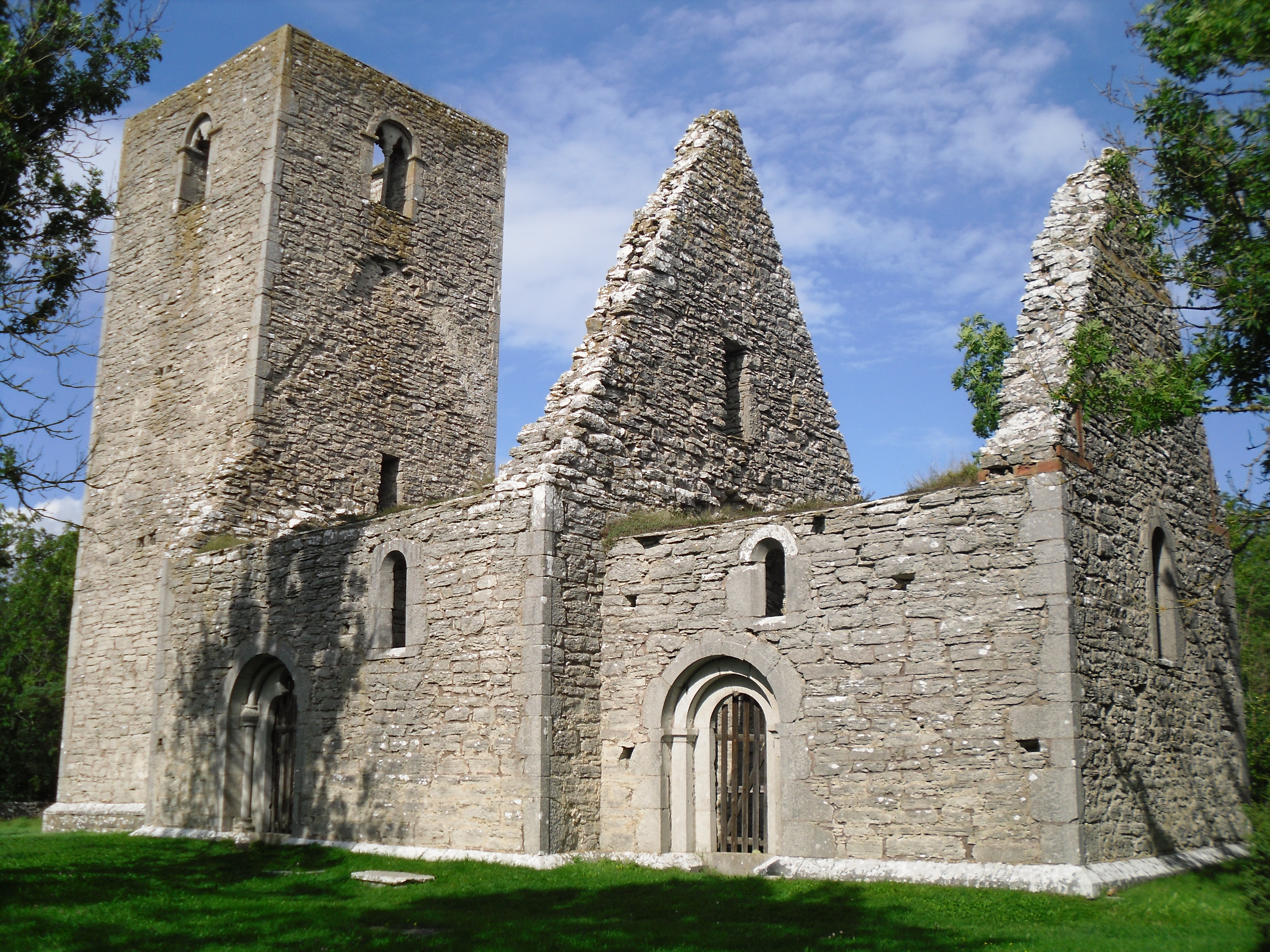
Gann Church (Ganns Ödekyrka)

Gann Church ruin (Swedish: Ganns Ödekyrka) is the ruin of an abandoned church (ödekyrka) in Lärbro socken on the Swedish island of Gotland. The stone church was built in the 13th century and presumed abandoned in the 16th century.

== History ==
The stone church structure consists of a chancel, nave and tower. The tower rests on the west wall of the nave. The tower was presumably built in the late 13th century. The church was presumably abandoned as early as in the 16th century. The chancel and arch contain mural paintings. The church grounds and gardens were preserved in 1924 and are now a tourist destination.

== Gallery ==
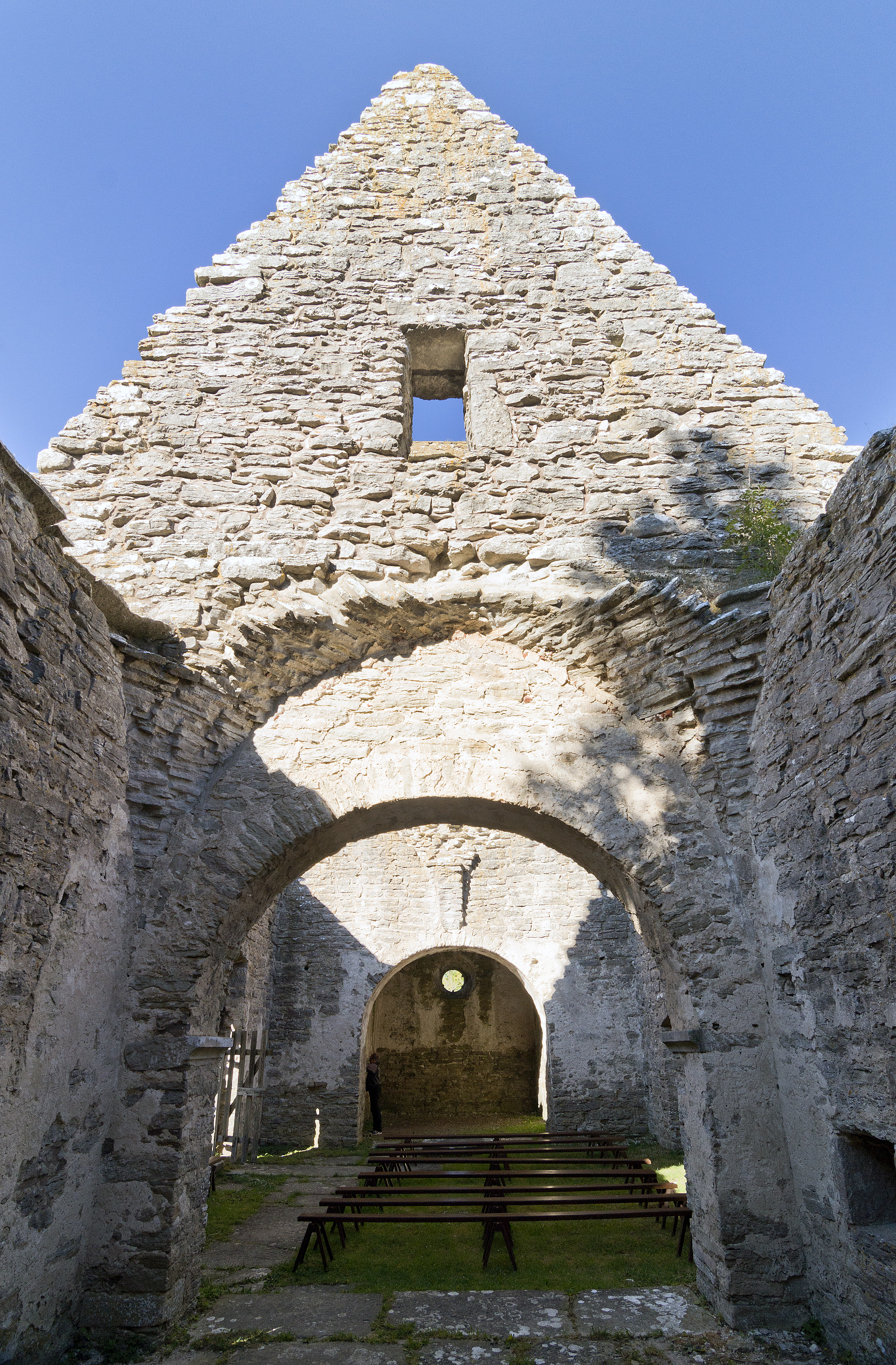

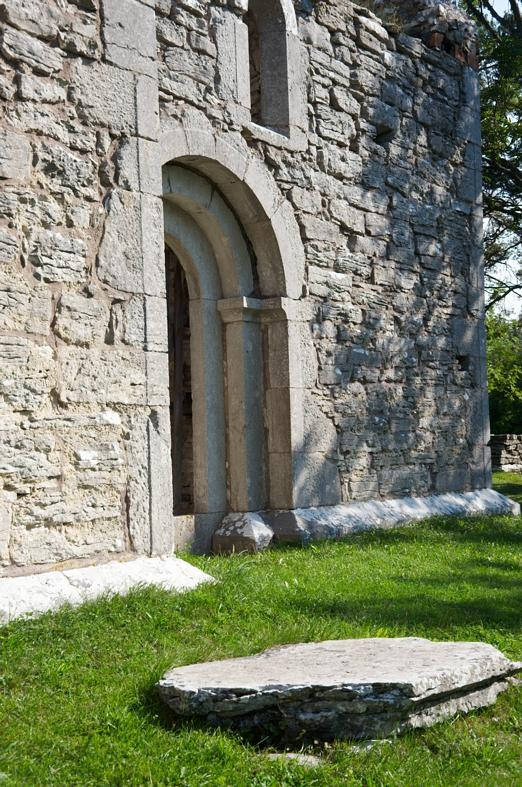

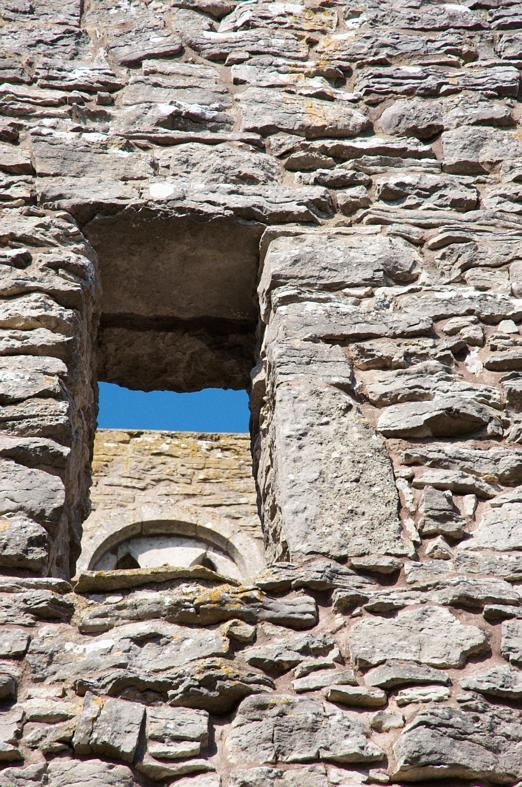

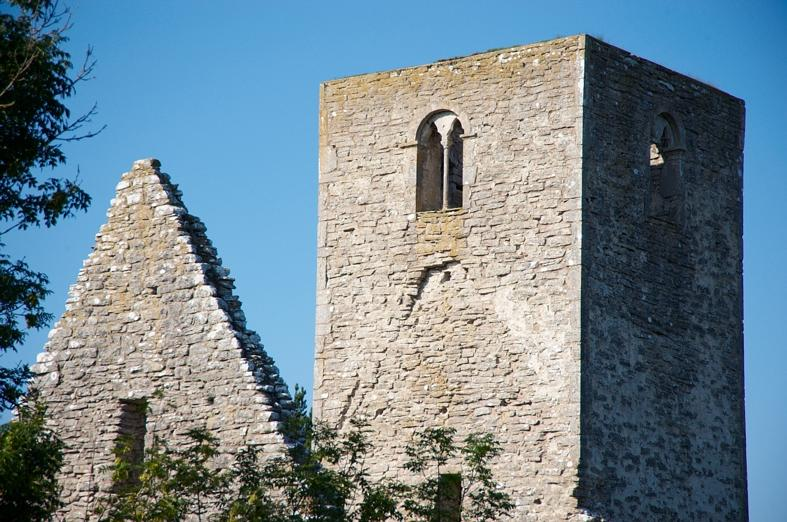

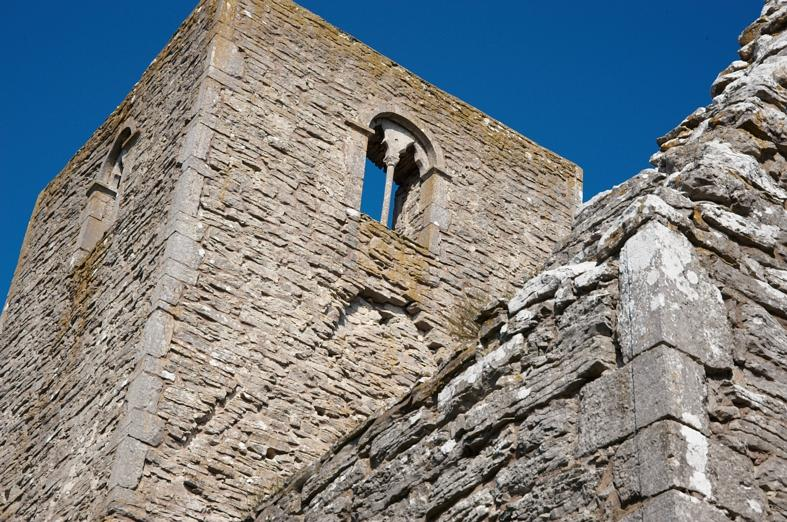

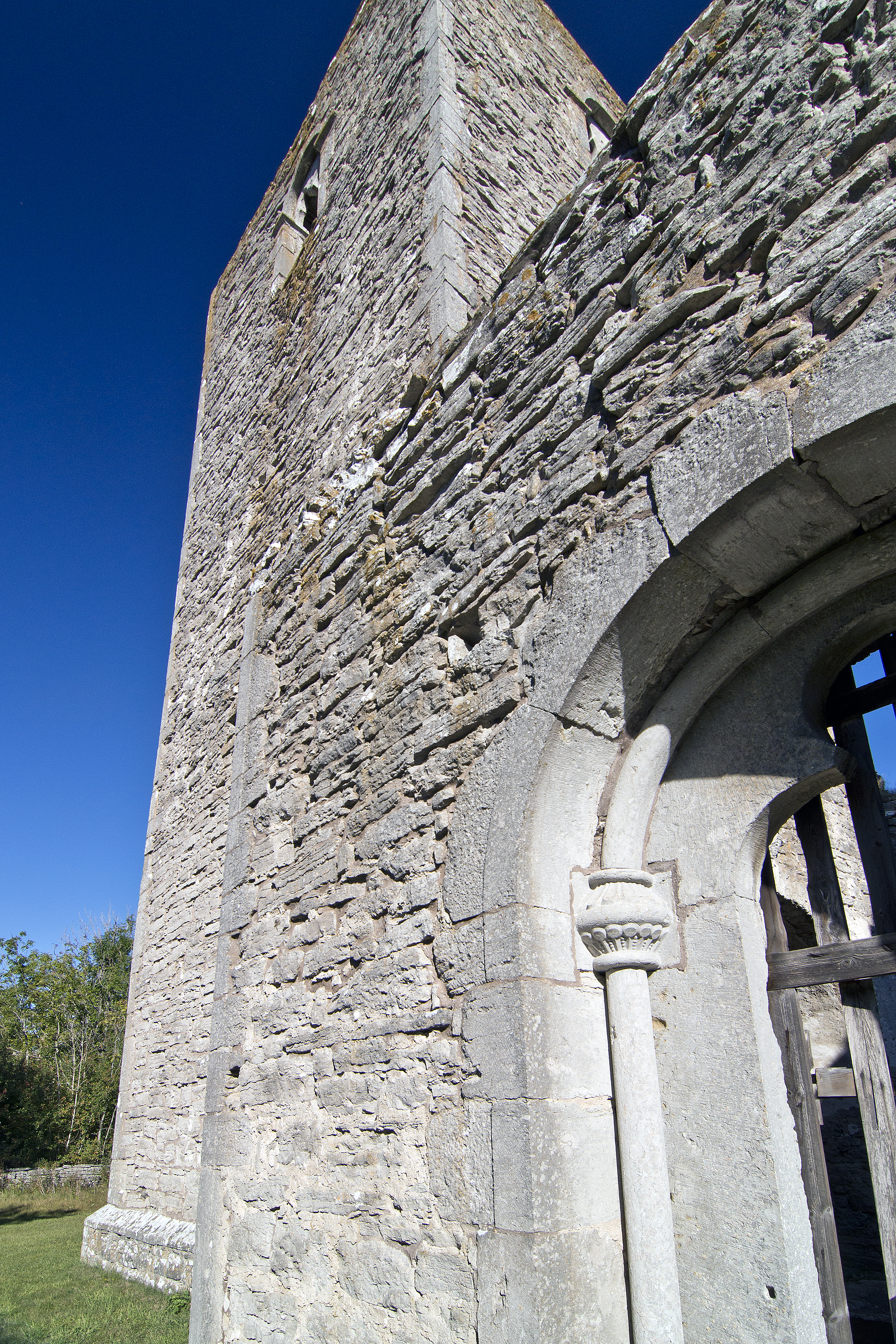

== See also ==
- List of church ruins on Gotland

== Related reading ==
- Lagerlöf, Erland (1973) Gotlands kyrkor (Uddevalla: Rabén & Sjögren) ISBN 9129410355
- Andrén, Anders (2011) Det Medeltida Gotland. En arkeologisk guidebok (Lund: Historiska Media) ISBN 978-91-85873-83-8
