= List of church ruins on Gotland =

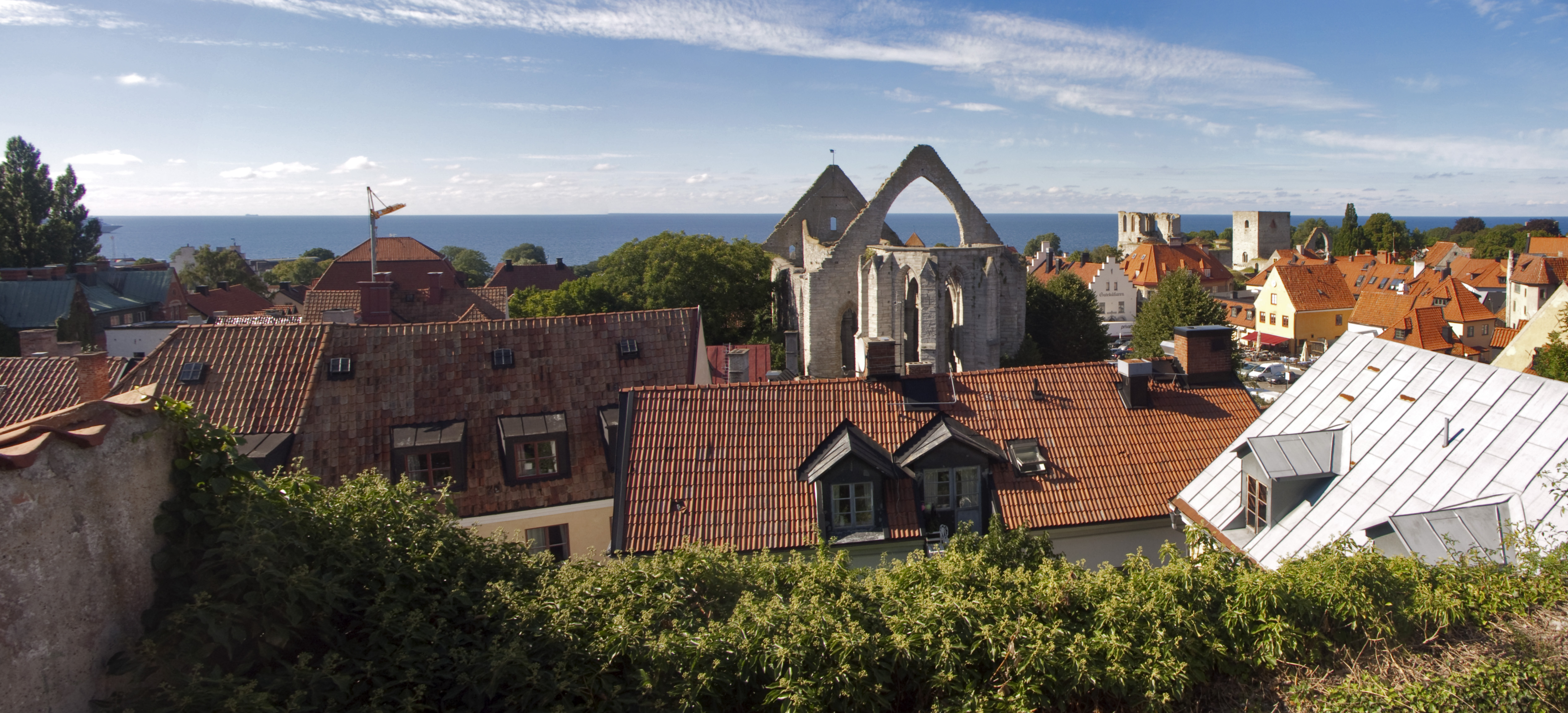
The skyline of Visby, dominated by the ruined Sankta Karin church

There are nineteen known ruined churches on the Swedish island of Gotland, twelve of which lie in Visby, the island's main town. Of these, ten lie within the medieval city walls. Three additional church ruins in Visby are known through written sources, but today completely vanished.

Gotland began to gradually abandon Norse religion and adopt Christianity during the 11th century. While the earliest churches were wooden, construction of stone churches began during the 12th century. The church building period was fairly short; in the countryside stone churches were erected between the early 12th and mid-14th centuries, while in Visby the last churches were inaugurated during the 15th century.

Some of these churches have since fallen into ruin. Of the 94 medieval parish churches in the countryside, 91 are still in use. Three were abandoned following the Reformation, when parishes were merged, and some churches became superfluous. There are in addition three chapel ruins, or ruins of small churches, in the countryside. There are also the ruins of two Cistercian abbeys, one in the countryside and one just outside the city wall of Visby.

Although the exact number of churches that existed in Visby during the Middle Ages is unknown, there were certainly more than in any other Swedish city, and at least twelve within the city walls. Visby grew to become an important trading port during the Middle Ages, and most of the churches in the city were built during the 12th and 13th centuries. The churches were not, as in the countryside, only parish churches. Some belonged to abbeys, almshouses or served groups of traders of a specific nationality, such as the Russian Church or present-day Visby Cathedral, which was originally a church used by German traders.

Following the Black Death, the invasion of Gotland by Valdemar IV of Denmark and the Battle of Visby in 1361, and a general decrease in trade, Gotland entered a period of decline. From about 1361, building activity therefore dropped. The inauguration of Sankta Karin in 1412 marks the end of church building activity in Visby. When troops from Lübeck pillaged the city in 1525, and probably damaged several of the churches, the social and economic rationale for sustaining them had vanished. With the advent of the Reformation soon afterwards, the religious rationale to sustain the upkeep of the many churches also permanently disappeared. All monasteries were abolished and all churches within the city walls except one (present-day Visby Cathedral) were abandoned and left to decay. During the following centuries, some church ruins were used as quarries. In 1805 the church ruins were protected by law and in 1863 the Swedish state for the first time allocated money for their conservation.

== List ==
Key: Location of ruined churches on Gotland
(Visby): Church ruins in Visby
(Location): Church ruins in the countryside

Name (in Swedish)	Location	Image	Description
Ardre ödekyrka	Ardre 57°21′57.56″N 18°41′18.16″E		Ardre Church Ruin, also known as the chapel of Gunfjaun, was built during the 14th century in the medieval marketplace. According to tradition, the church was built in memory of Gunfjaun, the son of a local chieftain named Hafder. It is doubtful whether the church building ever was completed.
Bara ödekyrka	Bara 57°35′04.82″N 18°36′41.57″E		Bara Church Ruin seems to have been abandoned already in the 16th century. In 1588 the local population demanded that it should be re-opened and repaired. The parish was however merged with that of Hörsne Church and Bara Church left to decay. The church was built in the 13th century and shares some characteristics with Anga Church.
Elinghems ödekyrka	Elinghem 57°48′42.51″N 18°37′09.48″E		Ellinghem Church Ruin consists of the remains of a 13th-century church. The medieval altar has been preserved in place, and in 1923–24 the remains of the baptismal font were found during an archaeological excavation of the church. It is not known when the church was abandoned, but this probably happened at the beginning of the 17th century.
Ganns ödekyrka	Lärbro 57°47′46.89″N 18°45′05.09″E		Gann Church Ruin is a well-preserved ruin of a church probably abandoned during the 16th century. The choir and nave of the ruined church date from the middle of the 13th century, while the tower was added slightly later (late 13th century). The remains were renovated in 1924.
Helgeand	Visby 57°38′35.01″N 18°17′54.20″E		The ruins of the church dedicated to the Holy Spirit are one of the most unusual of the church ruins in Visby. They consists of an octagonal two-storeyed nave and a protruding choir. The church was erected during the 13th century. According to one theory, the church was built for Bishop Albert of Riga, who is known to have been on Gotland in the early 13th century to gather crusaders and missionaries to go with him to Livonia. The church became the almshouse of Visby in 1532, but by the early 17th century was apparently in a ruinous state and used as a barn.
Roma kloster	Roma 57°30′58.32″N 18°27′37.44″E		Roma Abbey (Swedish: Roma kloster, Latin: Sancta Maria de Gutnalia) was a Cistercian abbey for monks founded in 1164. It lay on land close to the traditional location of the thing of all Gotland. The abbey was dissolved during the Reformation and its property and buildings confiscated by the (at the time Danish) Crown circa 1531. Even in its ruined state the abbey can be appreciated as a typical representative of Cistercian architecture.
Ryska kyrkan	Visby 57°38′26.85″N 18°17′48.32″E		No visible remains exist above ground of the so-called Russian Church. Archaeological excavations carried out in 1971 revealed the foundations of a small church under the floor of a house on Södra kyrkogatan street. It may have been one of possibly two churches for Russian traders in Visby during the Middle Ages.
Sankta Karin (sometimes Sankta Katarina)	Visby 57°38′25.29″N 18°17′44.59″E		The church of Saint Catherine was the church of a Franciscan convent. The convent was founded in 1233 and a first construction period took place c. 1235–1250. During the early 14th century reconstruction work on the church began, and was not finished until 1412, when the church was re-inaugurated. The abbey was disbanded during the 1520s, and the buildings were for a short while used as an almshouse before being completely abandoned.
Sankt Clemens	Visby 57°38′35.25″N 18°17′45.94″E		The church dedicated to Saint Clement was probably erected during the middle of the 13th century, but its history remains opaque. It was probably preceded by a smaller, 12th-century church. In its present state, it is still considered a typical representative of 13th-century Visby churches.
Sankt Drotten	Visby 57°38′30.33″N 18°17′42.72″E		The church was dedicated to the Holy Trinity but called Drotten after an old Norse word meaning Lord or King, i.e. referring to God. It is similar to Sankt Clemens but smaller and probably older. It seems to have been constructed mainly during the 13th and 14th centuries.
Sankt Nicolaus	Visby 57°38′38.83″N 18°17′53.02″E		The church of Saint Nicholas was the abbey church of a Dominican abbey, founded before 1230. Its most famous prior was Petrus de Dacia. The church is possibly older than the abbey; the monks may have acquired an already existing church, or one under construction. Enlargement and reconstruction works were carried out until the late 14th century. The church and abbey were probably destroyed by troops from Lübeck in 1525.
Sankta Gertrud	Visby 57°38′37.28″N 18°17′55.50″E		This small church or chapel was dedicated to Saint Gertrude of Nivelles. It is the smallest of the former churches in Visby. An excavation carried out in 1935 determined that it dates from the second half of the 15th century.
Sankt Göran	Visby 57°38′51.46″N 18°18′12.16″E		The church was dedicated to Saint George and lies about 300 metres (980 ft) outside the city walls. It was originally tied to an almshouse for lepers nearby. The church is lacking in decorative elements and has therefore been difficult to date. The choir and nave probably date from different periods. The choir is the oldest, perhaps from the late 12th or early 13th century, and the nave may date from the 13th century. The almshouse was shut down in 1542, but the cemetery continued to be used occasionally, e.g. during an outbreak of plague in 1711–12 and following an outbreak of cholera in the 1850s.
Sankt Lars	Visby 57°38′28.99″N 18°17′42.12″E		The patron saint of the church was Saint Lawrence. Construction of the church began during the second quarter of the 13th century. It was built by local stonemasons but in an unusual, cross-shaped form. Inspiration for this form probably came from Byzantine architecture and may have reached Gotland following the siege of Constantinople in 1204.
Sankt Per och Sankt Hans	Visby 57°38′16.82″N 18°17′33.54″E		The churches of Saint Peter and Saint Hans (the latter may refer to either John the Baptist or John the Evangelist) are joined together and form a single complex. The church dedicated to Saint Peter is the older, probably from the middle of the 12th century. It was successively rebuilt and enlarged. The history of Saint Hans is opaque, but it was built as a basilica. During excavations, two runestones and a picture stone have been found among the ruins, pointing to a possibly even older, pagan sacred site. Both churches have in later centuries been used as quarries for limestone.
Sankt Olof (Fårö)	Gamla hamn (Fårö) 57°56′31.13″N 19°05′25.48″E		The ruins of the small church or chapel traditionally called the Church of Saint Olaf are quite small, the remains of the wall not reaching higher than c. 0.6 metres (2.0 ft). Adjacent to the church ruins lie the remains of a cemetery. Today the ruins lie within a nature reserve.
Sankt Olof (St Olofsholm)	St Olofsholm 57°42′59.33″N 18°54′34.00″E		Three walls of a medieval chapel dedicated to Saint Olaf have been incorporated into a 19th-century barn. North east of the church a memorial cross was erected in 1959.
Sankt Olof (Visby)	Visby 57°38′34.78″N 18°17′37.83″E		Very little remains of the church once dedicated to Saint Olaf. It was probably a basilica built at the beginning of the 13th century.
Solberga kloster	Visby 57°38′0.70″N 18°17′55.50″E		Solberga Abbey (Swedish: Solberga, Latin: Mons Solis) was a Cistercian nunnery, founded circa 1246. It was the only nunnery on Gotland. It remains unclear when the nuns abandoned the convent, but they did so at latest at the time of the Reformation. Nearby a medieval cross marks the spot of the Battle of Visby, fought in 1361.

== See also ==
- List of medieval churches on Gotland
