= Lärbro =

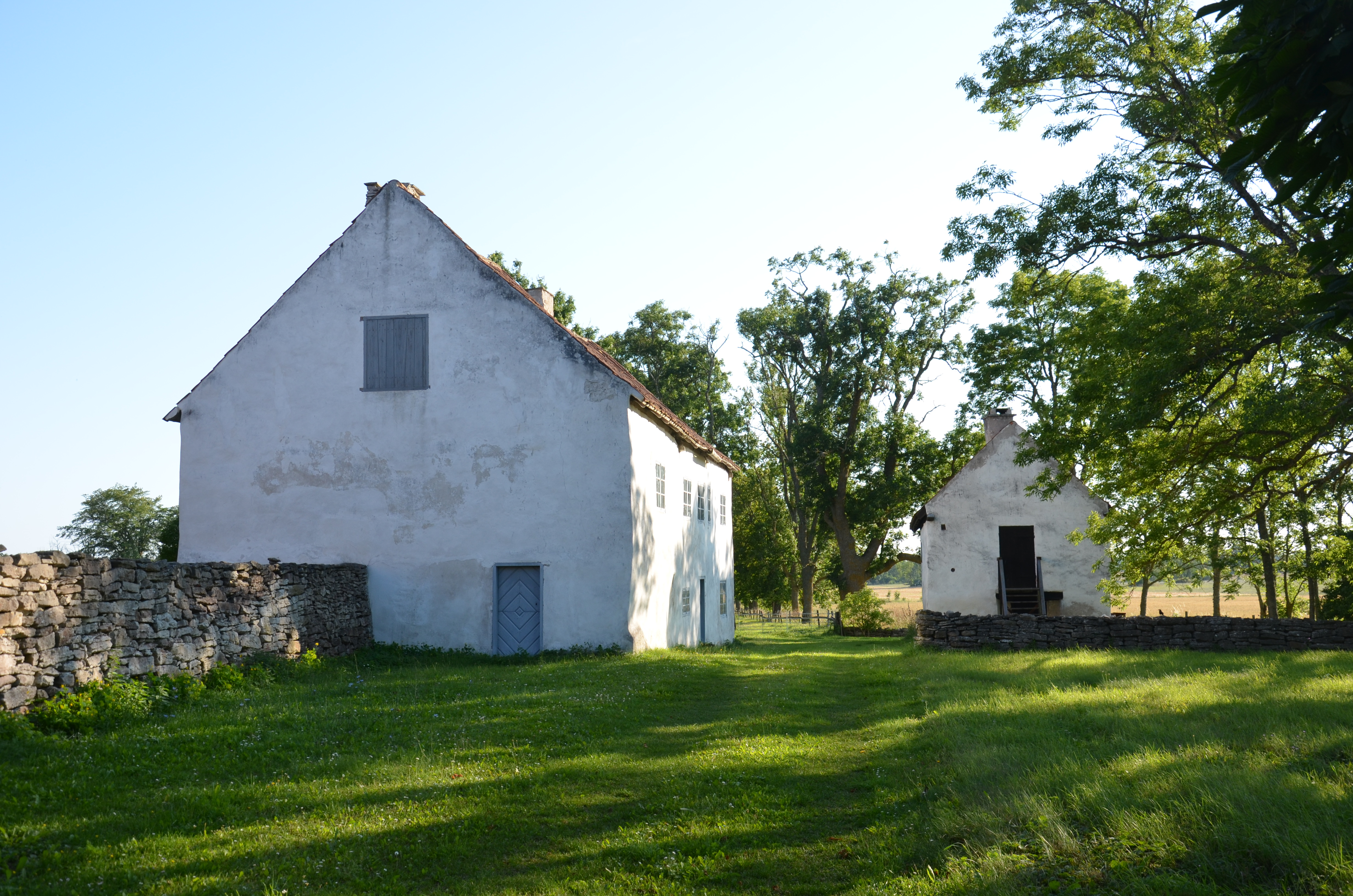
- Takstains museum manor in Lärbro

- Location within Gotland
- Coordinates: 57°47′N 18°47′E
- Country: Sweden
- Province: Gotland
- County: Gotland County
- Municipality: Gotland Municipality

Area
  - Total: 1.17 km^{2} (0.45 sq mi)

Population (31 December 2014)
  - Total: 963
- Time zone: UTC+1 (CET)
  - Summer (DST): UTC+2 (CEST)

Lärbro (Swedish pronunciation: [ˈlæ̂ːrbrʊ]) is a locality on the Swedish island of Gotland, with 963 inhabitants in 2014.

Lärbro is also the name of the larger populated area, socken (not to be confused with parish). It comprises the same area as the administrative Lärbro District, established on 1 January 2016.

== Geography ==
Lärbro is the name of the locality surrounding the medieval Lärbro Church, sometimes referred to as Lärbro kyrkby. It is also the name of the socken as well as the district. Lärbro is located in the northern part of Gotland, approximately 8 km (5.0 mi) north of Slite.

As of 2019, Lärbro Church belongs to Forsa parish in Norra Gotlands pastorat, along with the churches in Hellvi, Hangvar, Hall and Hallshuk.

One of the asteroids in the asteroid belt, 10126 Lärbro, is named after this place.

== History ==
From 1921 to 1960, Lärbro had a railway connection with Visby. The locality's main source of income is tourism. Gann Church ruin is in Lärbro.
