= ARY =

ARY may stand for:

- Abdul Razzak Yaqoob, a Pakistani expatriate businessman
- Andre Romelle Young, real name of Dr. Dre
- Ary and the Secret of Seasons, an action adventure video game
- ARY Digital, a Pakistani television network
- ARY Digital Network, a subsidiary of the ARY Group
- ARY Musik (formerly The Musik), a Pakistani Urdu-English music channel
- ARY News, a Pakistani news channel
- ARY One World, a bilingual news channel in English and Urdu
- ARY, the IATA airport code for the Ararat Airport
- ary, ISO 639-3 code for the Moroccan Arabic language
- Ary (footballer) (1919-unknown), Ary Nogueira Cezar, Brazilian footballer

== See also ==
- Arry (disambiguation)
- Arrie (disambiguation)
- Ari
