= Ari =

Ari may refer to:

== People and fictional characters ==
- Ari (name), a name in various languages, including a list of people and fictional characters
- Ari (born 1977), Dominican rapper based in Spain
- Rabbi Isaac Luria (1534–1572), Jewish rabbinical scholar and mystic, also known as Ari
- Ari (footballer, born 1980), Brazilian footballer
- Ari (footballer, born 1985), Brazilian-born naturalized Russian striker
- Ari (footballer, born 1986), Brazilian goalkeeper
- Ary (footballer), Brazilian goalkeeper

== Places ==
- Ari, Iran, a village in Mazandaran Province, Iran
- Ari, Abruzzo, a comune in Italy
- Ari, Indiana, an unincorporated town
- Ari Atoll, Maldives
- Ari, a neighbourhood in Bangkok, Thailand
- Ari BTS station, a skytrain station in Bangkok, Thailand
- Ari (Jammu and Kashmir), a village in Poonch district, India
- Mount Alfred (New Zealand), a hill in New Zealand also known by the native name of Ari

== Languages ==
- Ari language (New Guinea), a Papuan language of the Trans–New Guinea family
- Ari language (Ethiopia), an Omotic language of Ethiopia
- ari, ISO 639-3 code for the Arikara language, spoken by the Arikara people, mainly in North Dakota

== Other uses ==
- Ari: My Life with a King, 2015 Philippine film
- Abbreviation for Aries (constellation)
- Ari Motorfahrzeugbau GmbH, German manufacturer of the 1920s Arimofa car
- Perfume by Ariana Grande

== See also ==
- ARI (disambiguation)
- Arrie (disambiguation)
- Arry (disambiguation)
- Arikesari (disambiguation)
- Ari Buddhism, the religious practice common in Burma prior to the eleventh century
- Arri, supplier of film equipment
- Arizona Cardinals of the National Football League
- Arizona Diamondbacks of Major League Baseball
- Arizona Coyotes of the National Hockey League
