= Arrie =

Arrie may refer to:

- Ma Barker (1873–1935), sometimes known as Arizona Barker or Arrie Barker, mother of several noted American criminals
- Arrie W. Davis (born 1940), American lawyer and jurist
- Arrie Schoeman (born 1966), South African cricketer
- Arrie, Sweden, a locality in Vellinge Municipality

== See also ==
- Arrie Church, Arrie, Sweden
- Arry (disambiguation)
- Ari (disambiguation)
