= ARI =

ARI may refer to:

== Organizations ==
- Acoustics Research Institute of the Austrian Academy of Sciences
- Civic Coalition ARI, a political party in Argentina
- Aer Rianta International, an Irish state owned global airport retailing company
- American Refrigerant Institute, North America
- Angel Resource Institute
- Arthur Rylah Institute for Environmental Research, Victoria, Australia
- Associazione Radioamatori Italiani, Italian amateur radio association
- Astronomisches Rechen-Institut, an institute based in Heidelberg, Germany
- Astrophysics Research Institute, Merseyside, England
- Autism Research Institute
- Avicenna Research Institute, an Iranian biotechnology institute
- Ayn Rand Institute, promoting Objectivism

== Other uses ==
- Chacalluta International Airport in Arica, Chile (IATA code)
- Aberdeen Royal Infirmary, Scotland
- Acute respiratory infection
- Adjusted Rand index, a clustering metric
- A common abbreviation for the U.S. state of Arizona and its major professional sports teams
  - Arizona Cardinals of the National Football League
  - Arizona Diamondbacks of Major League Baseball
  - Arizona Coyotes of the National Hockey League
- Autofahrer-Rundfunk-Informationssystem, former German radio traffic broadcasts
- Automated readability index

== See also ==
- Ari (disambiguation)
