= Öja Church =

- Öja kyrka
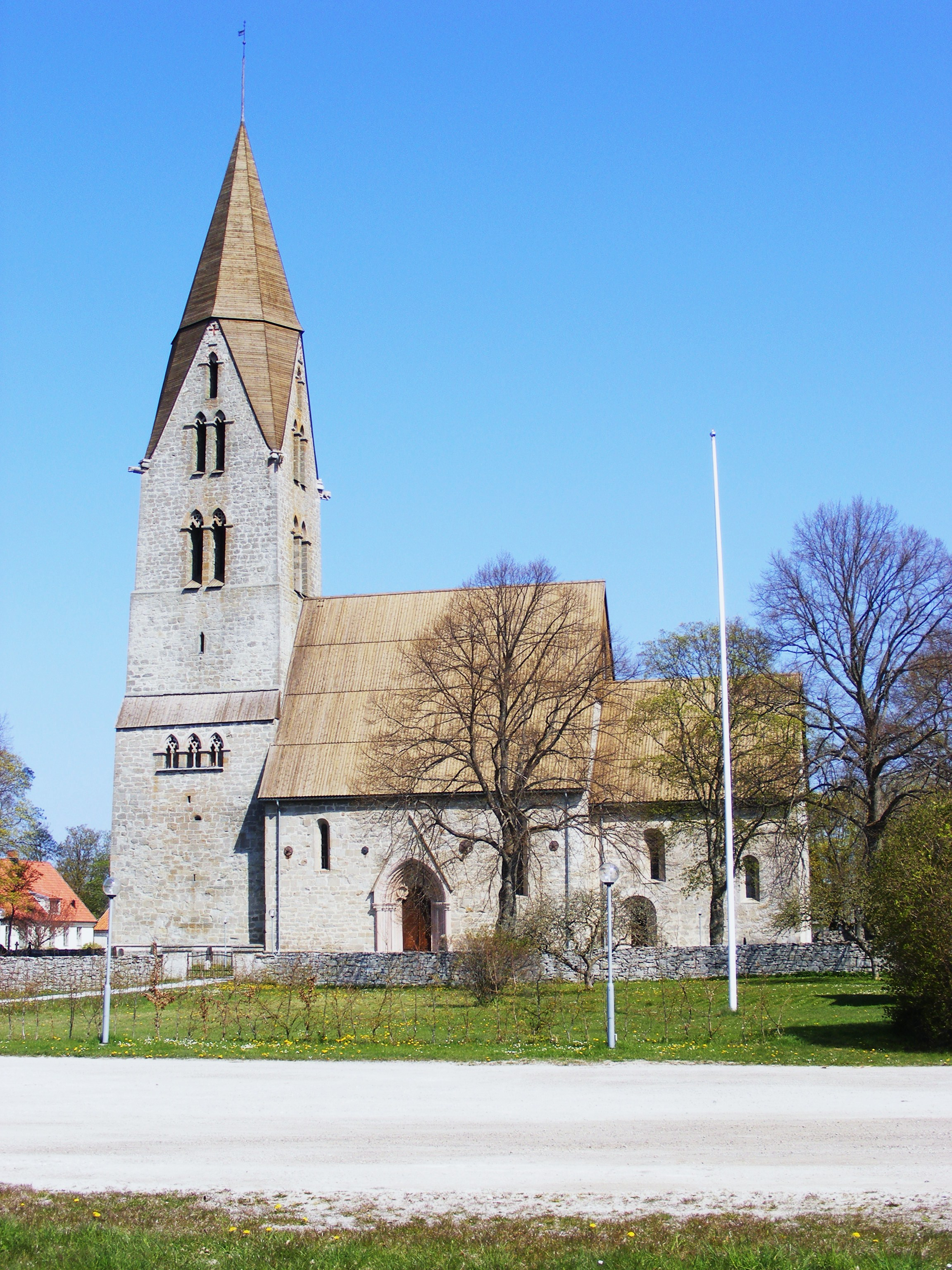
- Öja Church, view of the exterior

- Location on Gotland
- 57°02′08″N 18°17′59″E
- Country: Sweden
- Denomination: Church of Sweden

Administration
- Diocese: Visby

Öja Church (Swedish: Öja kyrka) is a medieval church in Öja on the Swedish island of Gotland. The church dates from the 13th century and contains an unusual large and elaborately decorated triumphal cross or rood. It belongs to the Church of Sweden and lies within the Diocese of Visby.

== History ==
Öja Church is built in a place of ancient cultural traditions. The name, from the Swedish word ö, meaning island, indicates that the place was inhabited before the area became a part of mainland Gotland (through the process of post-glacial rebound), i.e. during the Iron Age, sometime between circa 500 BCE and 500 CE. As late as 1987, there were still fields in the area cultivated according to a system of land use which probably developed already then, or possibly even during the Bronze Age.

The first church on the site was built during the 12th century. Of this first Romanesque church, only a few sculpted fragments have survived, incorporated into the presently visible, largely Gothic church. During the 13th century, construction of the present building began. The choir with its internal apse was built first, during the first half of the century. The nave was added after, at the end of the century, while the tower was added during the 14th century. The construction of the church indicates that the original plans did not include a separate tower, but rather a tower above the western end of the nave. Scholars have concluded that the tower was built by a stonemason's workshop which is sometimes referred to by the notname Egypticus, which was also active at e.g. Grötlingbo and Hablingo churches, located elsewhere on Gotland.

The church has remained largely unchanged since the Middle Ages, with the exception of the vestry which was added in the 19th century.

== Architecture ==
Externally, the church is noteworthy for its unusually well-preserved tower, complete with original gargoyles and gable decorations. The church also has three carved Gothic portals, of which the northern is the mostly richly decorated. This portal is decorated with sculptures of Jesus, Mary, John the Evangelist and a peculiar sculpture of a saint lying down, interpreted as Saint Eligius.

The interior of the church is dark and characterised by the church's sturdy columns and pillars. The walls are decorated with murals dating from the 15th century, depicting the Passion of Christ and scenes from the childhood of Christ, made by the artist known as the Master of the Passion of Christ. In addition, purely ornamental decoration from the 13th century adorns the vaults, and a few more unusual murals, probably made by an artist from Denmark or mainland Sweden, decorate the choir.

The church has a large and elaborately carved triumphal cross. It has been executed by a wood-carver, possibly trained in France, who might also be the artist behind a somewhat similar cross in Fröjel Church and it dates from the late 13th century. The unusually elaborate crucifix has been called "Gotland's most admired wooden sculpture" and "one of Gotland's most well-known medieval pieces of art". Beneath the cross are furthermore copies of two almost equally well-regarded sculptures depicting Mary and St. John (the original sculptures are now in the Museum of Gotland in Visby).

== Gallery of pictures of the triumphal cross ==
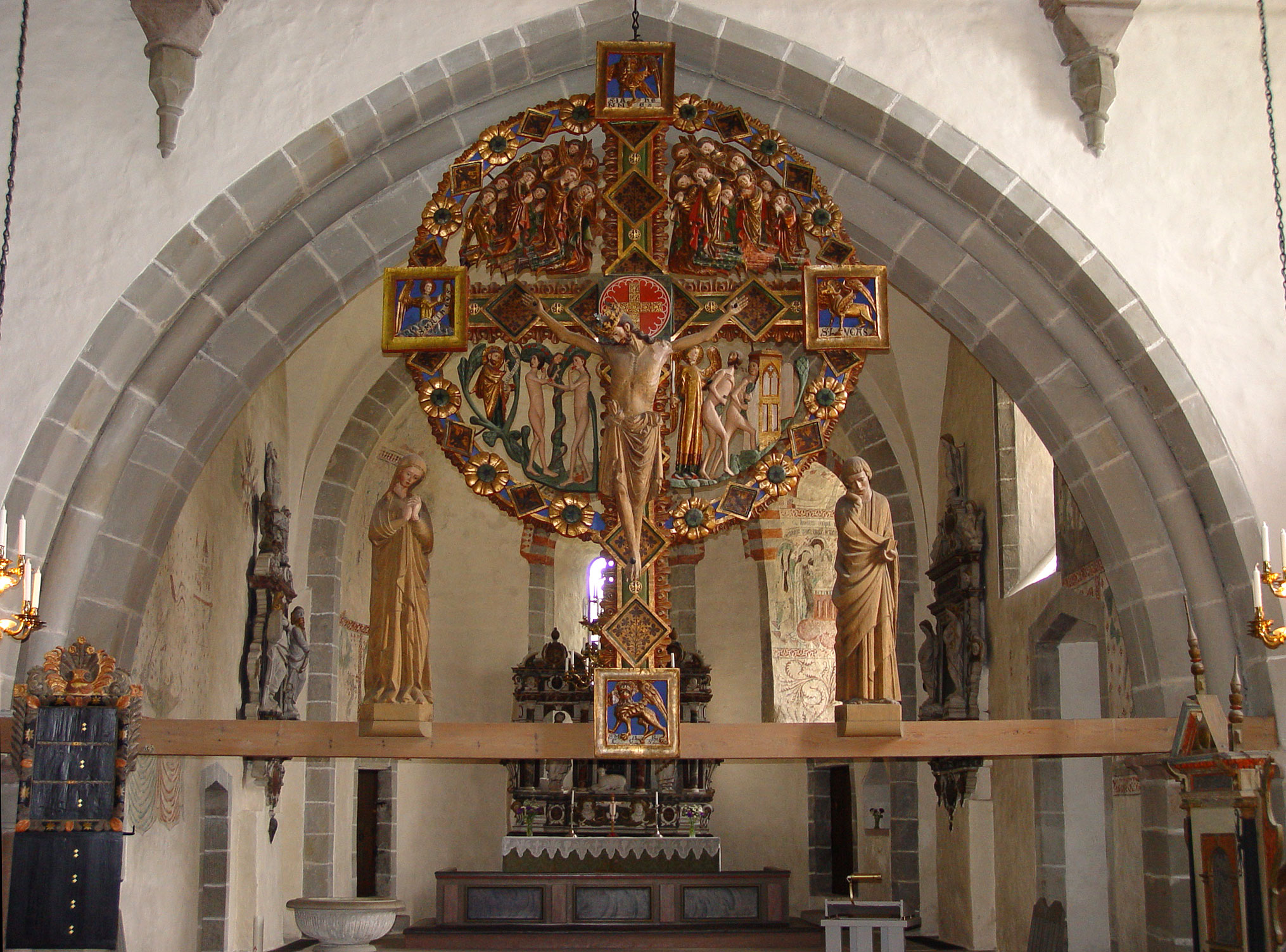
The triumphal cross of Öja church and its location in the church

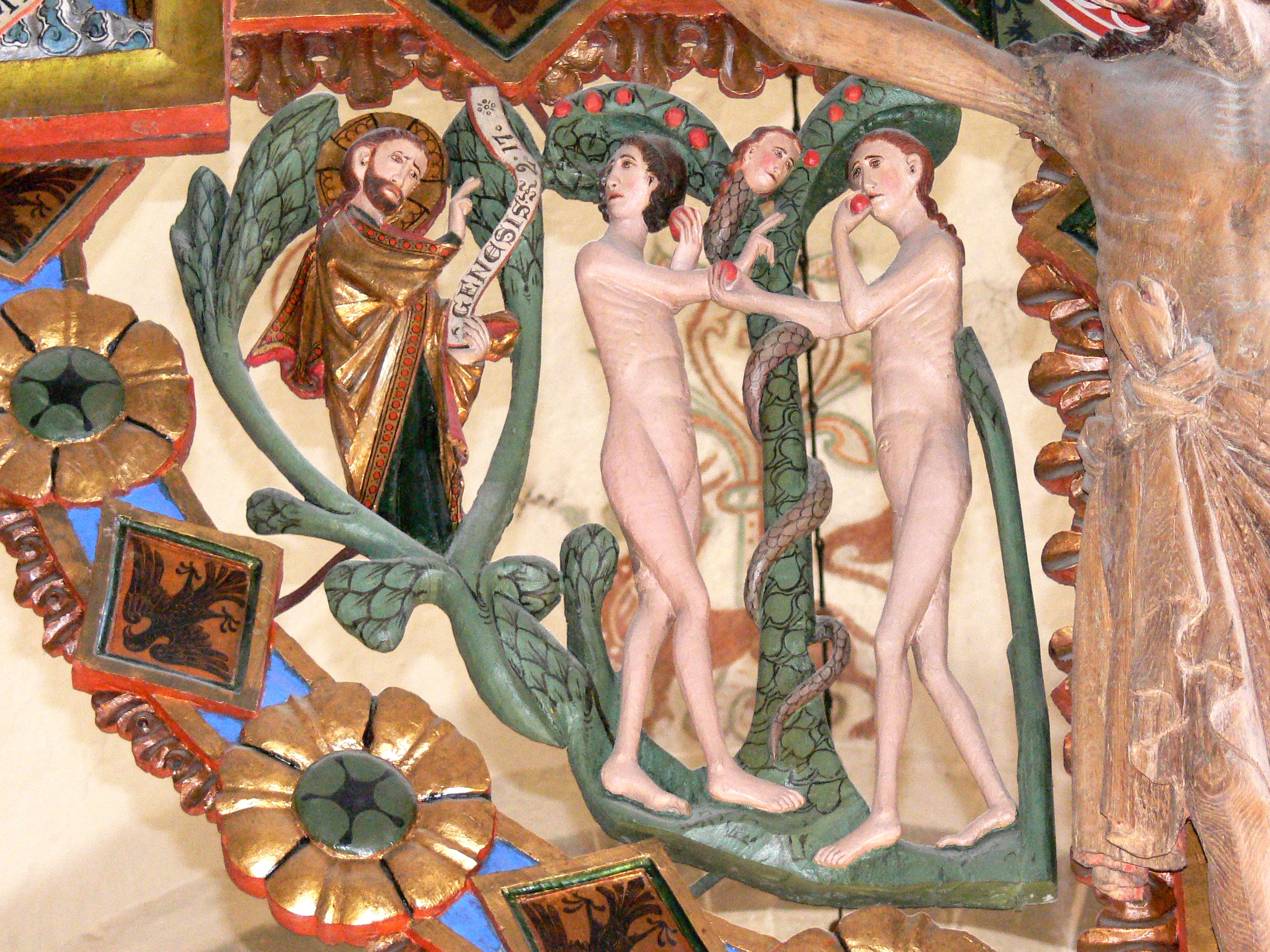
Detail

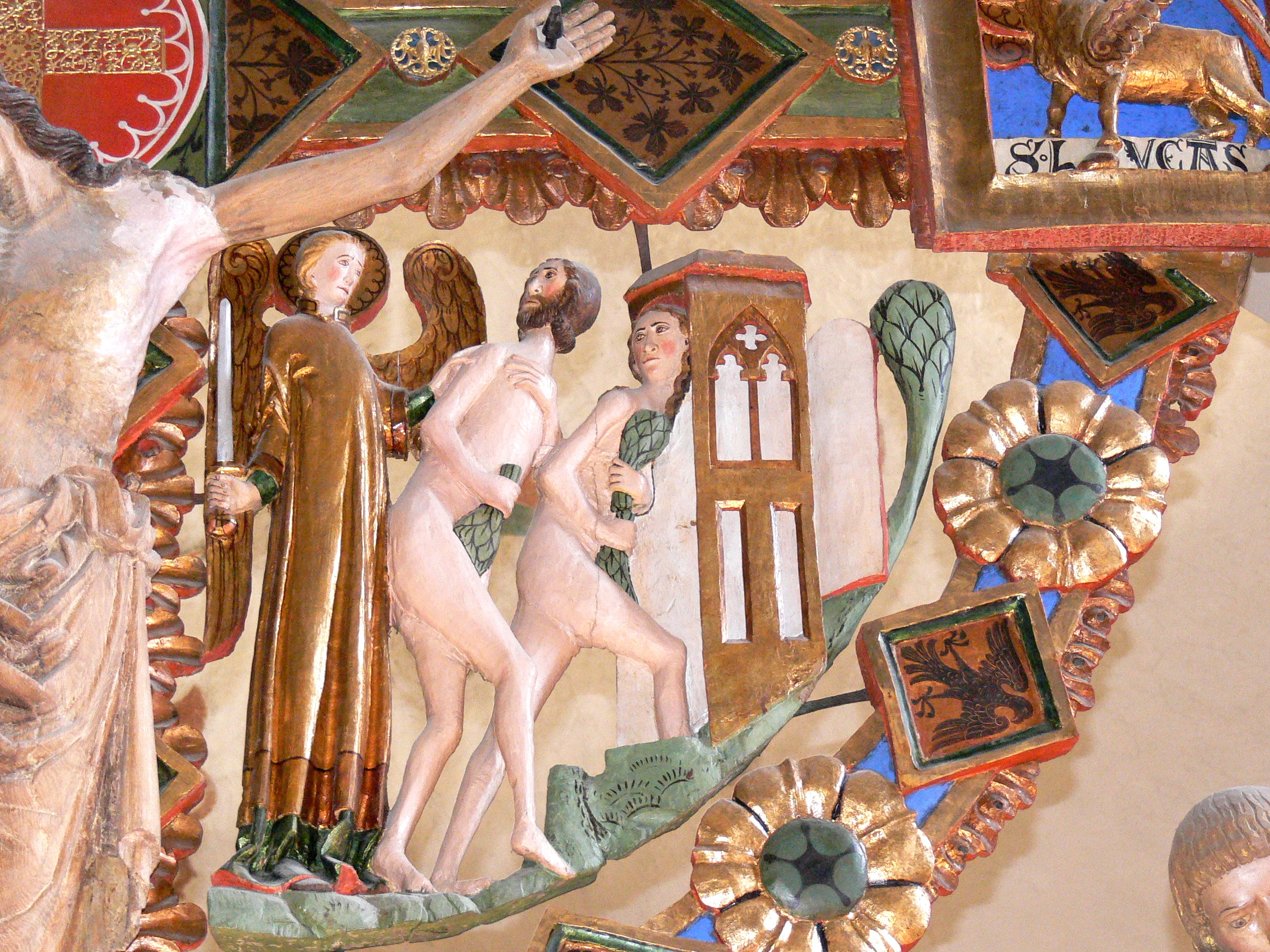
Detail

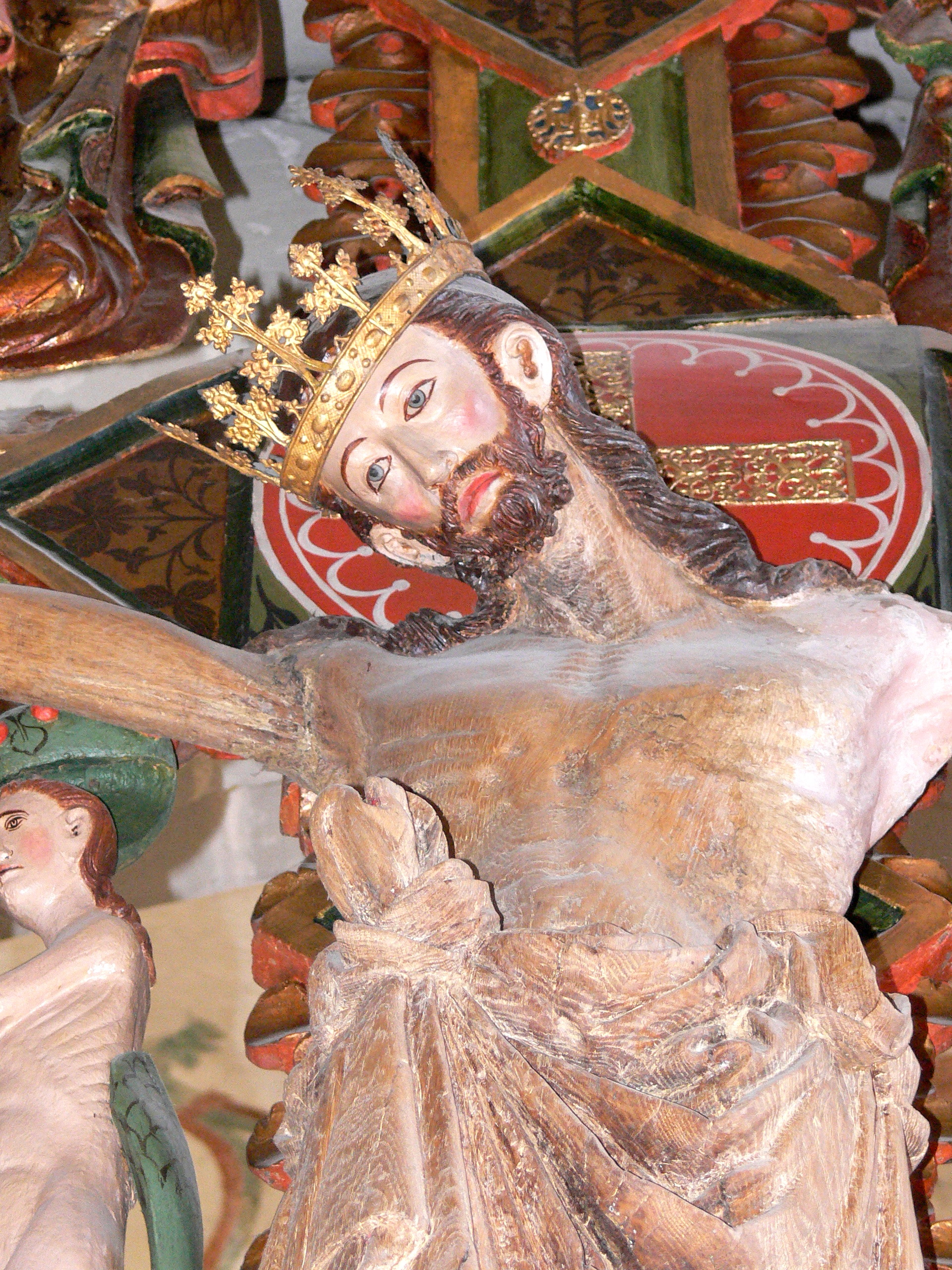
Detail

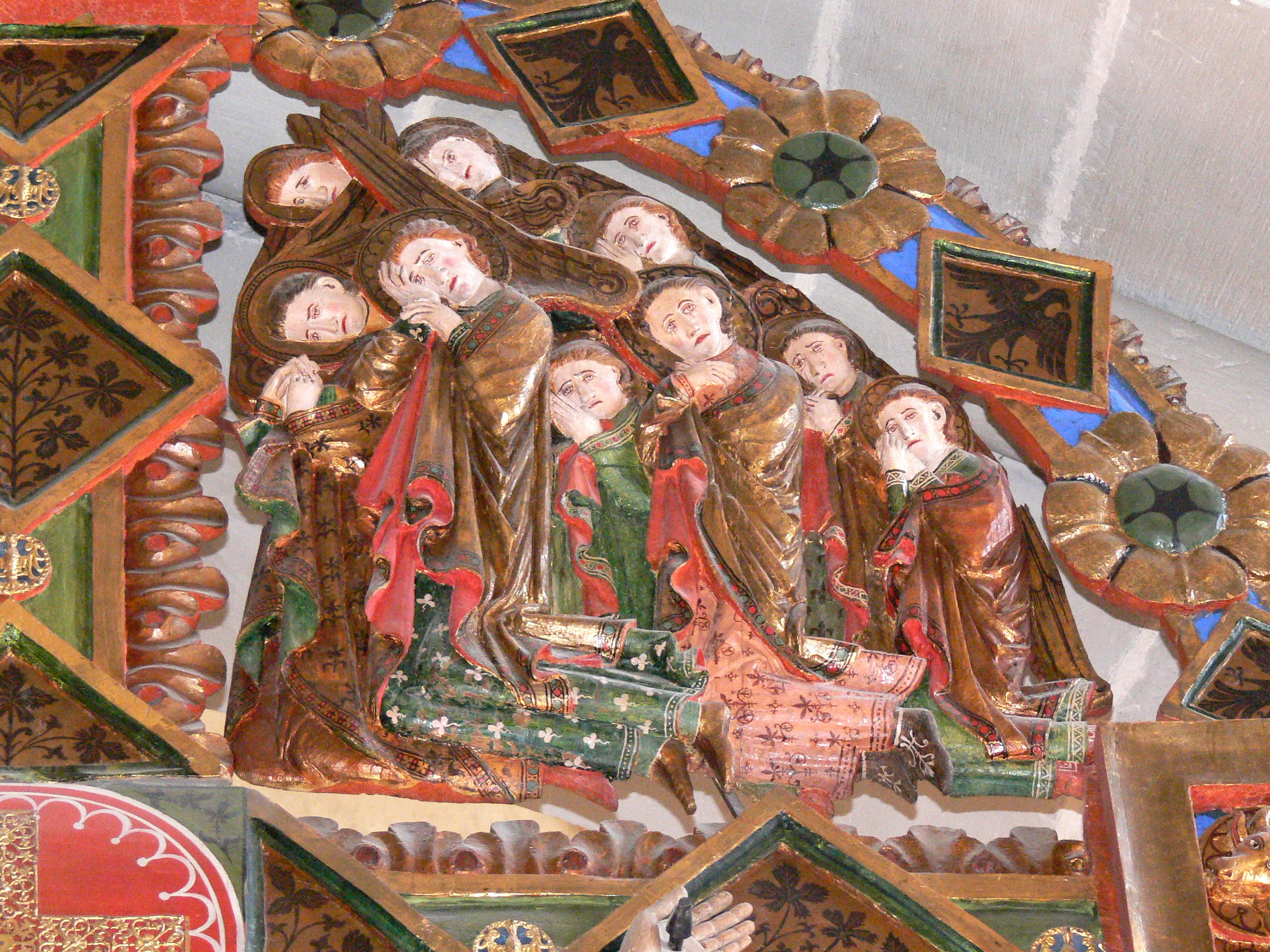
Detail
