= Linde Church =

- Linde kyrka
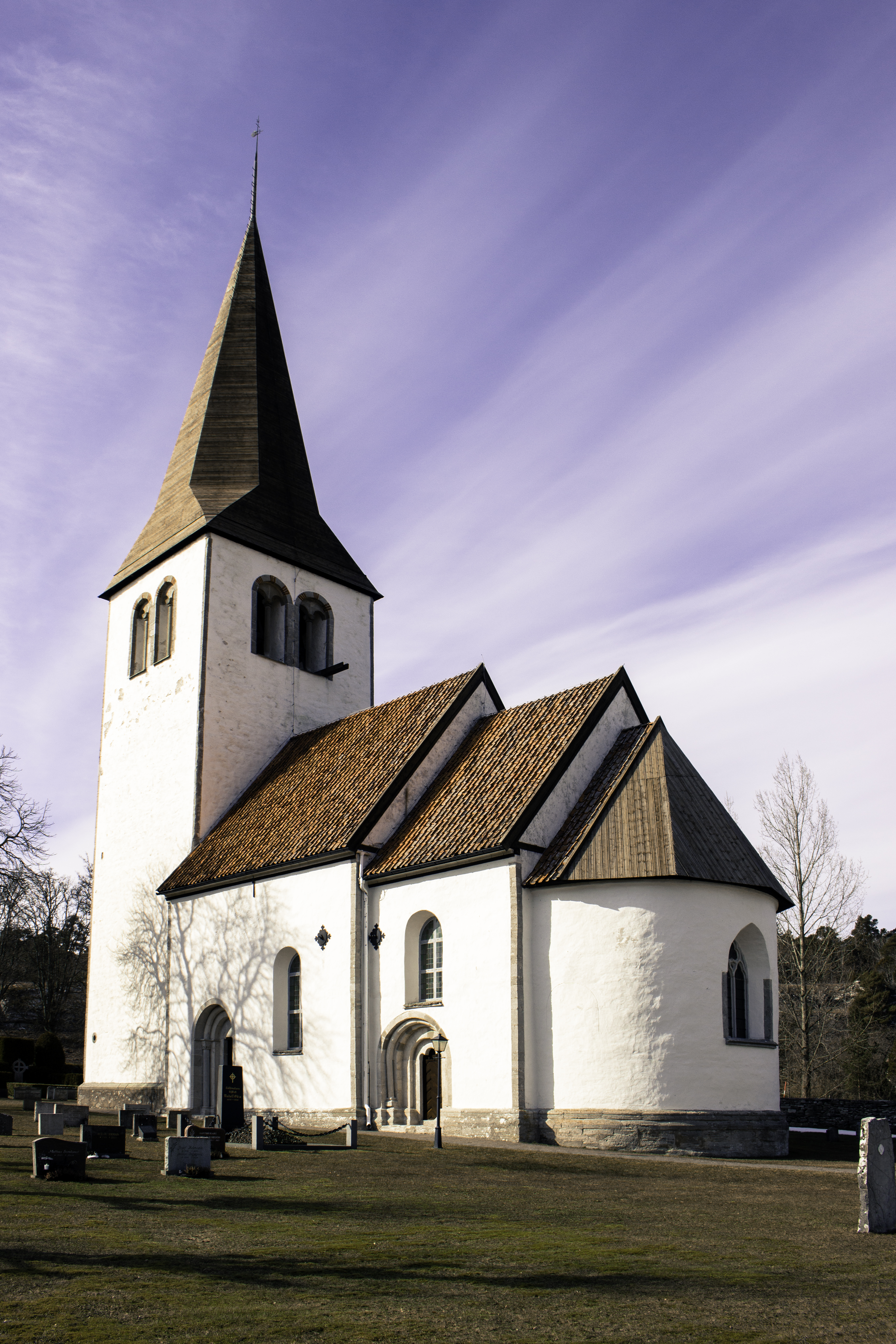
- Linde Church

- Location on Gotland
- 57°16′47″N 18°22′47″E
- Country: Sweden
- Denomination: Church of Sweden

Administration
- Diocese: Visby

Linde Church (Swedish: Linde kyrka) is a medieval church on the Swedish island of Gotland. The church was built between the 12th and the early 13th century and is Romanesque in style. I lies in the Diocese of Visby.

== History and architecture ==
Linde Church is a homogeneous Romanesque church. Construction of the presently visible church started in the late 12th century and was finished in the early 13th. A single, large Gothic window was inserted in the eastern wall in the 14th century. In 1951-52, the church was renovated, and again in 1973-75.

The external nave and choir portals are both decorated with Romanesque sculptures. Inside, the church is decorated with murals. On the northern wall is a set of paintings depicting the Passion of Christ, dating from the 15th century. On the western wall is another set, also from the 15th century, depicting women being harassed by devils. Among the church furnishings, the altarpiece from 1521 is especially noteworthy. It depicts God the Father with Christ, with Saint Giles and Saint Olaf on each side of them. Additionally, the doors of the altarpiece contain sculptures of the apostles, Saint Canute, Saint Eric and Saint Bridget. The church furthermore contains a copy of a triumphal cross today kept in the Swedish History Museum. The original dates from the end of the 12th century. The church furthermore rather unusually contains two baptismal fonts. Both are probably from the 12th century, and one may be a work by the stonemason Hegvald.

South-west of the church lie the ruins of a medieval house, probably the former parsonage.
