= Lye Church =

- Lye kyrka
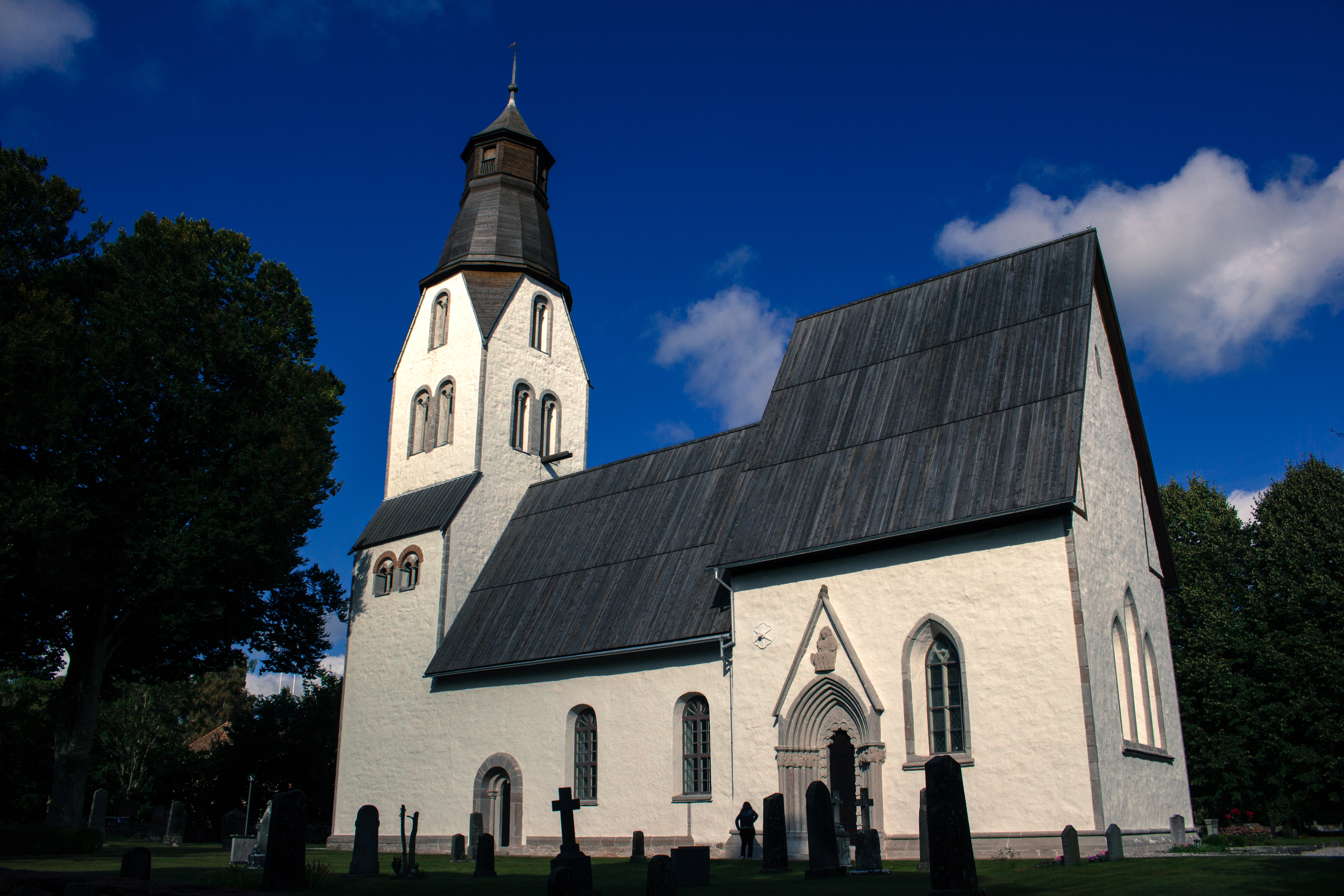
- Exterior view from the south-east

- Location on Gotland
- 57°17′52″N 18°31′35″E
- Country: Sweden
- Denomination: Church of Sweden

Lye Church (Swedish: Lye kyrka) is a medieval church on Gotland, Sweden. The oldest parts of the church date from the last quarter of the 12th century, and the last major addition was the disproportionately large chancel, built during the second quarter of the 14th century by a workshop known by its notname as Egypticus. The workshop was also responsible for constructing the largest of the church portals, which is also decorated with Gothic stone sculpture. The tower portal contains sculptures attributed to the Romanesque sculptor Sigraf. The church has been little altered since the end of the Middle Ages. Lye Church contains the largest preserved set of medieval stained glass windows in the Nordic countries, and its interior is also decorated with medieval wall paintings, uncovered in the 1950s. The altarpiece is from 1496, and the church also contains a triumphal cross from the same period.

== Location and surroundings ==
Lye Church is located c. 300 metres (330 yd) south of the main road between Hemse and Ljugarn, on south-eastern Gotland. The church lies surrounded by its old cemetery. A low (80 to 130 centimetres (2.6 to 4.3 ft)) stone wall, built sometime between 1765 and 1793 to replace an earlier wooden fence, limits the cemetery to the south, east and west. The northern part of the wall is partially demolished and opens up to a newer section of the cemetery, established north of the old one in 1944. The cemetery has four entrances. The formerly northern limit of the old cemetery is marked by a row of European ash and the younger part is bordered on all sides by small-leaved limes. A small storage building, constructed sometime before 1846, lies in the northwestern part of the old part of the cemetery.

== History ==
Lye Church was built and to a large extent acquired its current appearance during the Middle Ages. No major alterations have been made since the 14th century.

=== Construction ===
The oldest part of the church, probably constructed during the last quarter of the 12th century, is the nave, built in a Romanesque style. The tower was erected during the first half of the 13th century. When the tower was built, the western wall of the nave was demolished so that the tower could be incorporated with the church building. The difference between the bases of the tower and the northern nave wall still indicate where the break was made. The Gothic chancel and sacristy are from the second quarter of the 14th century and replaced an earlier chancel, constructed at the same time as the nave. They were built by a workshop operating on Gotland which has been assigned the notname Egypticus. The portal of the former chancel was removed and reinstated in its present position as north entrance to the nave. The intention was probably to also rebuild the nave, but this was never done. The walls connecting the chancel and nave are still the provisional, thin walls without a marked base which were put in place in anticipation of further changes.

=== Later changes ===
The decorated wooden ceiling dates from the 18th century. The three windows of the nave probably all date from the 1850s and replaced earlier, much smaller windows. A major renovation of the interior of the church was carried out in 1891. The floors of the chancel and nave were renewed, and the pews replaced with new ones. The altar rail was replaced, as was the organ facade. Central heating was installed in 1932. In 1939, the presently visible roof of the tower was installed, modeled after an earlier roof possibly designed by architect Olof Tempelman and dating from 1779. Tempelman's designs were probably executed by builder Hans Hesselby, who also constructed the roof of the tower at Ala Church in 1780. The earlier roof may have resembled those at Garde or Burs churches. Another large-scale renovation was done in 1954–55 under the guidance of architects Erik Fant and Olle Karth. The main structural change was that the walls of the nave were heightened c. 1 metre (3.3 ft) with the dual purpose of exposing the top part of the arch connecting the chancel with the nave, and installing a modern, fire-proof ceiling above the wooden ceiling. The walls of the nave and chancel were at the same time cleaned, and the medieval paintings found under layers of whitewash restored. Wall paintings from the 18th century were removed, and some of the furnishings renovated. The exterior was renovated and the presently visible roofs were put in place in 1968.

== Architecture ==
=== Exterior ===
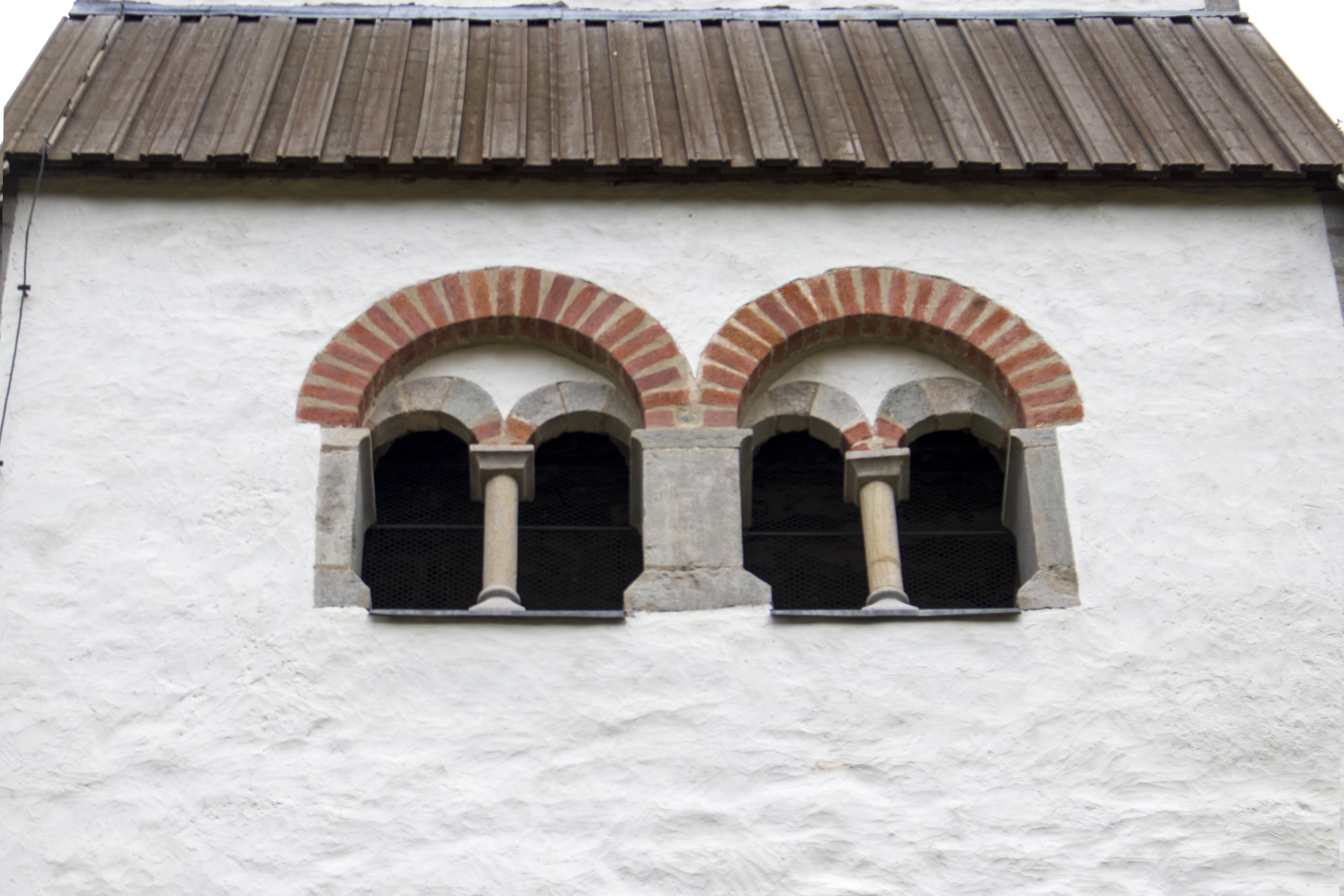
One of the Romanesque galleries of the tower from the outside

The walls of Lye Church are constructed of mainly grey, tufted limestone, whitewashed on the outside. A few details are made of brick and of limestone of a different colour. The portals, bases and skirtings around some of the windows are of dressed limestone, as are the corners of the chancel and tower. In broad outlines, the nave and tower are Romanesque in style while the chancel is Gothic. The disproportionate aspect of the church is derived from the fact that the rebuilding of the church during the Middle Ages was never finished, hence the later and larger chancel dominates the east end of the church. The shape, not uncommon among churches on Gotland, has been compared to that of a pack saddle.

The tower is the most well-preserved Romanesque part of the church. On the north and south side of the first storey there are galleries accessible from inside the tower, each with two openings in the form of round arches separated by a small column. The outer archivolts of these openings are made of alternating limestone and brick, an unusual construction material on Gotland during the Middle Ages. The upper level contains the church bell, which dates from 1650 and was made in Stockholm. There are three openings for the bell on each side of the square tower. All of them with have round arches and each opening is divided in two by a central, wooden column.

==== Portals ====
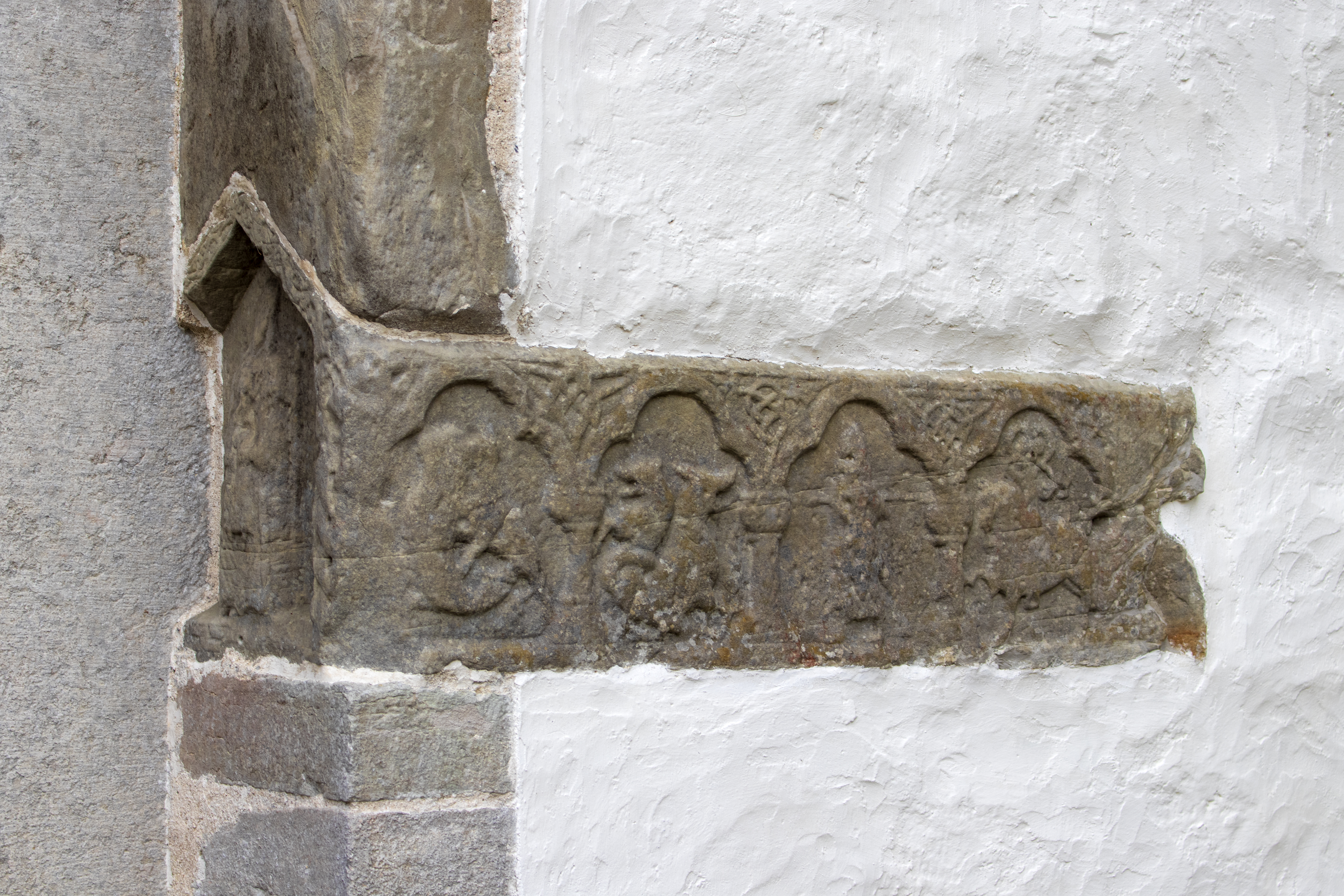
Stone container with a Romanesque frieze immured in the tower portal

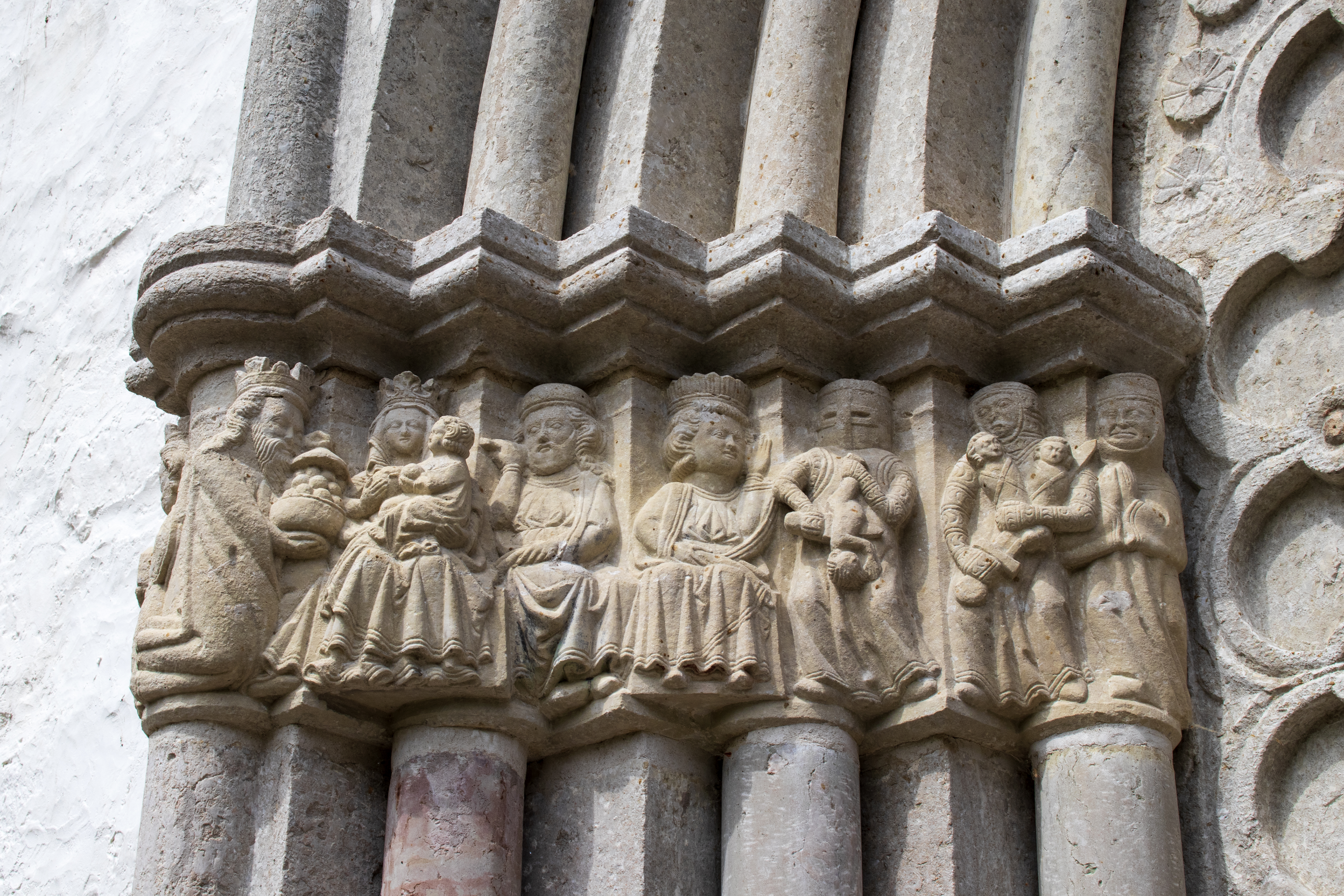
The western capitals of the chancel portal, depicting the Adoration of the Magi (left) and the Massacre of the Innocents

The church has four entrance portals. Three of these are Romanesque: the western entrance in the base of the tower, the northern entrance to the nave and the southern entrance to the nave. The chancel portal is larger and more profusely decorated.

The tower portal has a round outer arch which consists of alternating red and grey limestone; the inner arch is made of grey, roughly hewn limestone. Immured as part of the southern post is a decorated stone container, which may originally have been intended as a sarcophagus or a reliquary but later used as building material. It has been roughly adjusted to fit into the church wall. The exposed sides are decorated with figures in low relief. The short side facing the door depicts the Madonna enthroned while the long side, facing the exterior, depicts scenes which have been interpreted as (from left to right) two legendary creatures fighting, two dragons or possible one dragon with two heads, a warrior with armour and weapons, and a horse. It has been suggested that the subject matter depicted is the story of Sigurd slaying the dragon Fafnir. The reliefs date from the 12th century and have been attributed to the Romanesque artist or workshop Sigraf (floruit c. 1175–1210).

The northern portal of the nave is the smallest entrance to the church. Its round arched opening is constructed of alternating blocks of limestone and sandstone. It appears to not be original to its position and may have been removed from the earlier, demolished chancel to its present location during the Middle Ages.

The southern portal of the nave is constructed of alternating red and grey limestone. Its inner section consists of two pillars of convex cubic form supporting a round arch.

The chancel portal is the largest of the entrances, and Gothic in style. It is a comparatively richly decorated, pointed arch crowned by a wimperg made of grey and red limestone. The tympanum is decorated with sculpted flowers, and the capitals of the nested columns each contain a set of sculptures with the overarching theme being the childhood of Christ. The sculpted eastern capitals show, from left to right, the Annunciation, the Visitation, the birth of Christ, and the annunciation to the shepherds. The western capitals contain scenes showing, from left to right, the Adoration of the Magi and the Massacre of the Innocents. The wimperg above the portal depicts Christ enthroned, with one hand raised in a blessing and the other resting on a book. The sculptures are unusually well preserved, and a few of the figures still contain faint traces of original colour (black, red, and green). The sculptures show several similarities with those at Norrlanda Church and have been described as some of the best examples of the art of Egypticus.

=== Interior ===
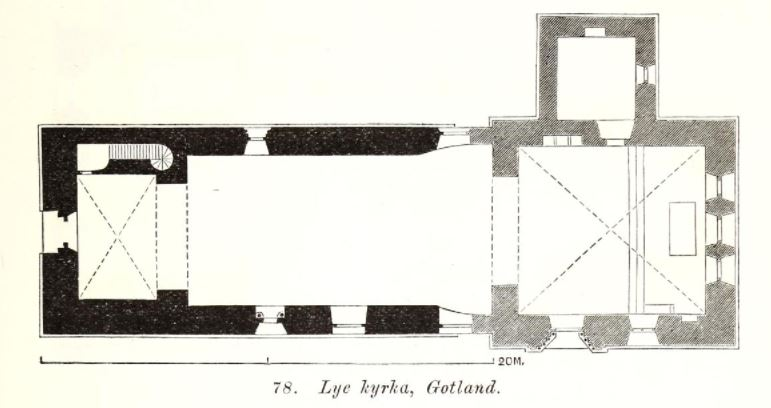
Floor plan

The interior is divided into three main rooms, and the sacristy. The westernmost room is the ground floor of the tower. It is a broad, vaulted room that opens toward the nave with a wide arch. The nave is rectangular, with a flat, wooden ceiling. The chancel is relatively large and high, lacks an apse, and has a vaulted ceiling. The nave and chancel are connected by a pointed limestone arch. The sacristy ceiling is supported by a groin vault. There are three niches in the walls of the chancel. Of the two in the northern wall, one is most probably a medieval tabernacle with still original doors and flanked by two immured limestone capitals, probably also made by Egypticus. The other niche on the same wall consists of three compartments and its doors probably date from the 1891 renovation. On the same wall is the entrance to the sacristy, between a simple trefoil-shaped portal of limestone. In the church floor there are also several medieval gravestones, including one made for a local man called Jakob, who according to the inscription was killed by a cannonball while participating in a siege of Eric of Pomerania at Visborg castle in the outskirts of Visby in 1449. The walls of the church also contain a number of carvings in the surface of the wall, made in historic times. These include some pictorial, depicting among the subjects a Troy Town and 15th-century ships, as well as around 40 runic inscriptions. As late as 2018, an earlier unknown runic inscription was discovered in the church; although its meaning remains unclear, it may be a profanity.

==== Wall paintings ====
The interior of Lye Church is decorated with medieval wall paintings from three separate periods. The paintings were covered with layers of whitewash during the 18th century and exposed and restored during the church renovation in the 1950s. The oldest set of paintings date from c. 1350 and decorate the chancel vault and its northern wall with large-scale figures. The paintings on the northern wall have been supplemented with other paintings from the 15th century. The second set of paintings date from around 1450 and adorn the walls of both the nave and the chancel. They depict the Passion of Christ as well as scenes from legends of saints and individual saints within frames imitating architecture. These were made by the Passion Master or that workshop. The third set of paintings date from the second quarter of the 16th century and encompass two scenes on the southern wall of the nave. Only a few wall paintings of such late date are known from Gotland.

==== Windows ====
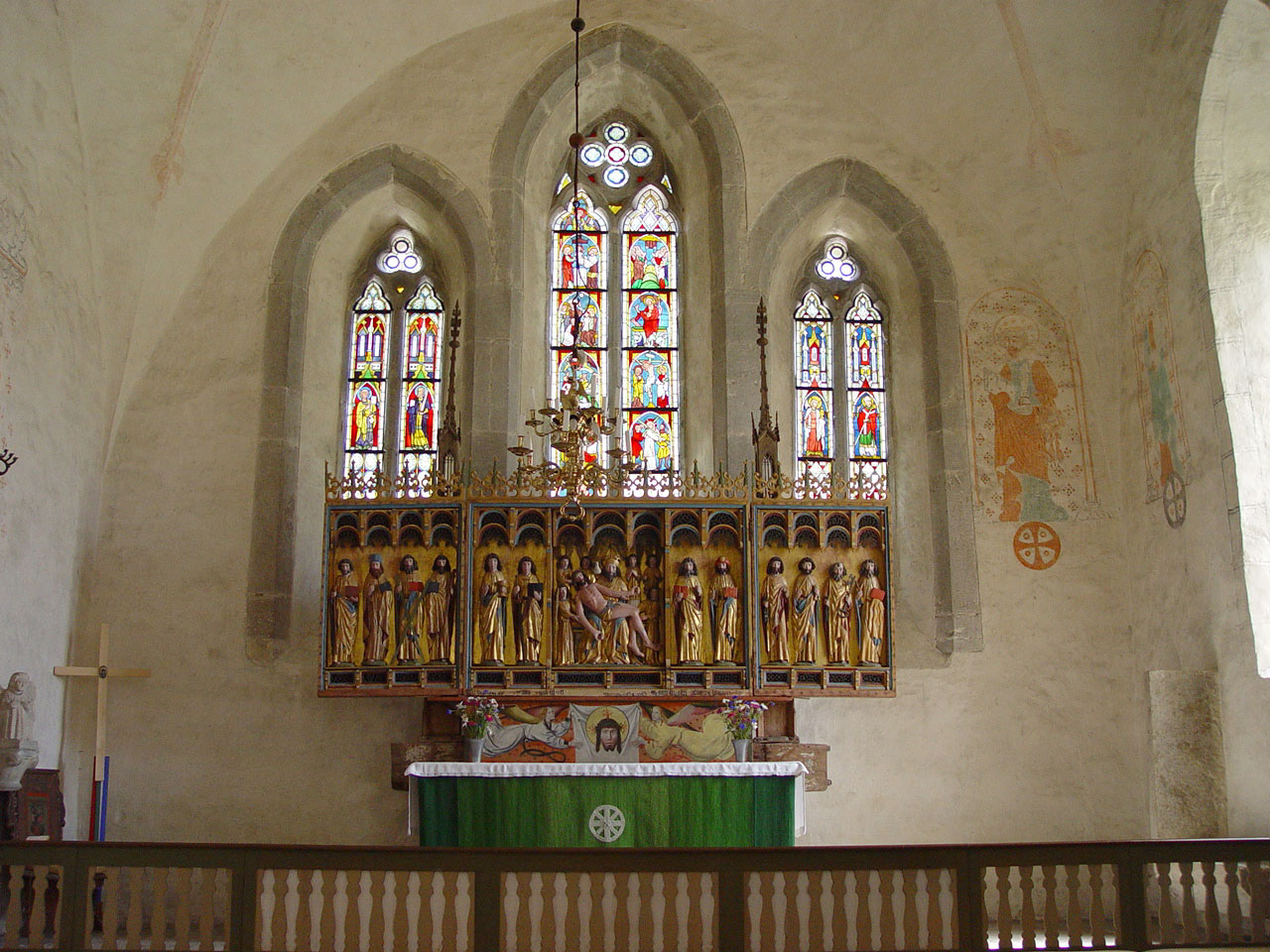
View of the chancel with the stained glass windows and the altarpiece

Lye Church contains the largest preserved set of medieval stained glass in the Nordic countries. They are also among the best preserved, and of the highest artisanal quality. Stained glass panes are preserved in the eastern and southern windows of the chancel. In total, there are 15 window panes with figurative depictions, four panes with architectural details and 15 with decorative foliage, all dating from the construction period of the chancel. The subject matter of the middle of the eastern chancel windows are the life of Christ. The northern half of the window contains scenes from the childhood of Christ until the Presentation of Jesus at the Temple, and the southern half scenes from the Passion until the Ascension. The two windows on each side of the middle window, as well as the window in the southern wall of the chancel, contains depictions of individual saints and purely ornamental window panes.

The windows are in a High Gothic style, the figures depicted as slim and delicate, with loose clothes and rhythmically curly hair and beards. The overall composition is airy, with few overlaps between the different elements. The colours are dominated by the blue of the background and the red bands that separate the figures; the windows are comparatively paler and cooler in colour than earlier stained glass windows on Gotland. The overall impression has been described by art historian Johnny Roosval as "incense for the eye".

It has been suggested that the glass windows were made by a workshop active in Visby. Roosval argued that the main stylistic influences for the windows in Lye came from English Gothic, while Aron Andersson instead argued that the main influences came from northern Germany.

== Furnishings ==
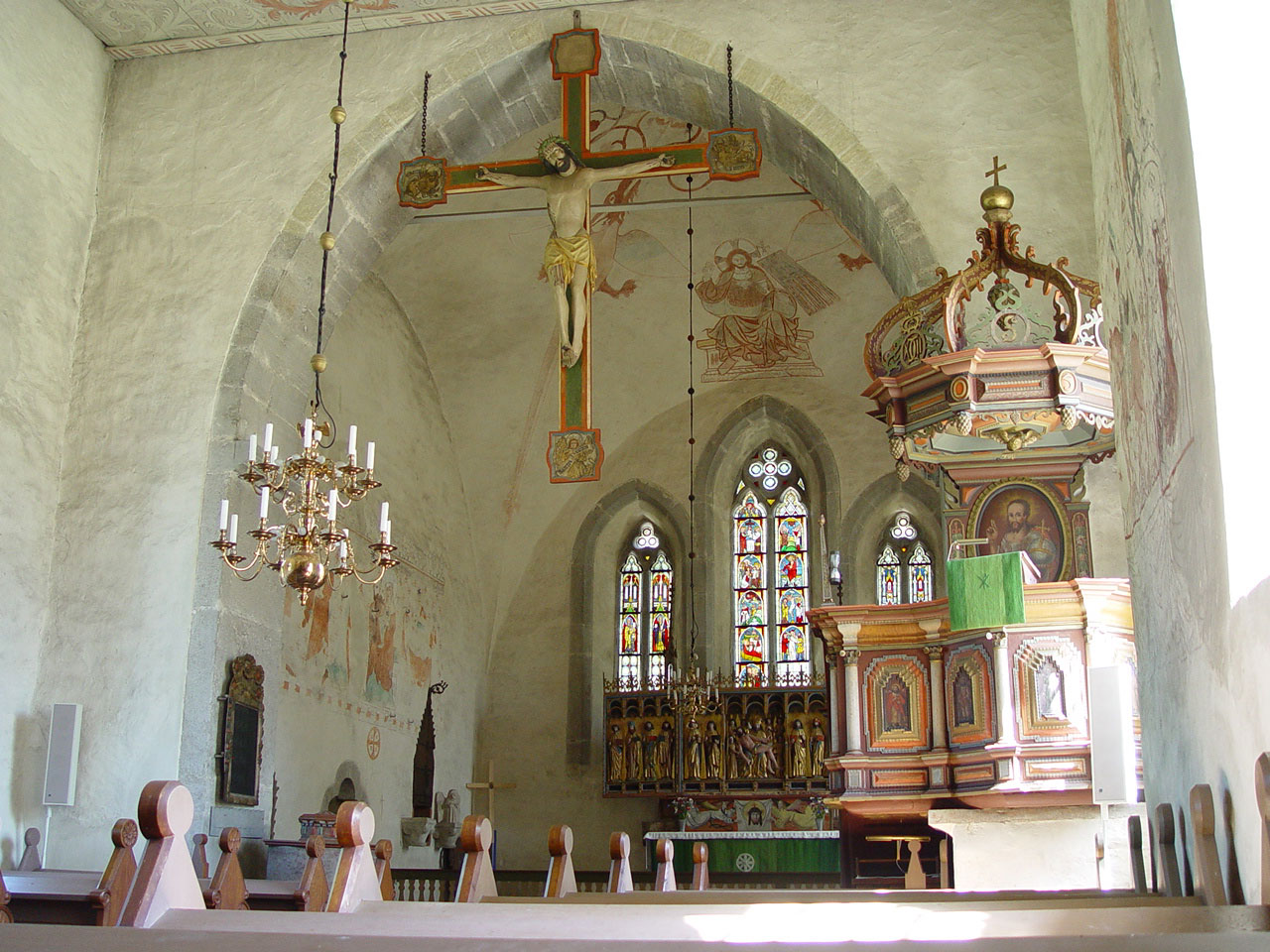
View towards the chancel. To the right is the pulpit, in the chancel arch hangs the triumphal cross, and inside the chancel the altarpiece, stained glass windows and the medieval tabernacle in the wall are all discernible

The altarpiece carries an inscription in Latin which relates that it was donated to the church in 1496 by a farmer named Jon who lived in the parish. It is made of painted and gilded oak, and consists of a centrepiece, flanked by pinnacles, and two wings. The middle section contains a sculpted representation of God the Father with the dead Christ in his arms, surrounded by angels. It is flanked by twelve statuettes of the apostles. The outsides of the wings are decorated with rather severely damaged paintings, depicting the saints Olaf, Lawrence, John the Baptist and Stephen. The predella is painted with a depiction of the Veil of Veronica.

The triumphal cross hanging under the chancel arch is a work from the late 15th century, possibly made by the same artist who made the altarpiece. It depicts Christ on the cross with black hair and beard and a green crown of thorns. Its overall height is c. 350 centimetres (140 in). The limestone baptismal font lacks decoration and dates from the middle of the 13th century. The pulpit is marked with the date 1705 and the monogram of King Charles XII of Sweden. It was painted in 1726 with depictions of the Four Evangelists and the apostles James and Peter.

Four medieval items from Lye Church are today in the Swedish History Museum in Stockholm. Two are former altarpieces, both damaged, one of which depicts the revelations of Saint Bridget of Sweden. The other two items are a 13th-century Limoges enamel processional cross, and a gilded Limoges enamel and copper figure of Christ.

== Current use and heritage status ==
Lye Church belongs to Garde parish within Sudertredingens kontrakt, (Note: A "kontrakt" within the Church of Sweden is approximately equivalent to a rural deanery.) itself part of the Diocese of Visby within the Church of Sweden. Lye Church is an ecclesiastical monument, number 21300000002810 (sub-number: 21400000444058) in the buildings database of the Swedish National Heritage Board. In 2019, Lye Church was one of the first 56 cultural heritage monuments on Gotland and in Sweden to be explicitly marked with the blue and white shield of the Hague Convention for the Protection of Cultural Property in the Event of Armed Conflict.

== Bibliography ==
=== General ===
- Andrén, Anders (2011). Det Medeltida Gotland. En arkeologisk guidebok (in Swedish). Lund: Historiska Media. ISBN 978-91-85873-83-8.
- Jacobsson, Britta; Johansson, Eva; Johansson, Per; Andersson, Rolf (1990). Våra kyrkor. Västervik: Klarkullens förlag AB. ISBN 91-971561-08.
- Lagerlöf, Erland (1965). Lye kyrka (in: Kyrkor på Gotland : Garde ting : södra delen). Sveriges kyrkor, konsthistoriskt inventarium (in Swedish). Vol. 105. Stockholm: Esselte. pp. 3–95. ISSN 0284-1894.
- Svahnström, Gunnar (1973). Lagerlöf, Erland (ed.). Gotlands kyrkor (in Swedish). Uddevalla: Rabén & Sjögren. ISBN 9129410355.

=== Stained glass ===
- Andersson, Aron (1964). Die Glasmalereien des Mittelalters in Skandinavien (Corpus vitrearum Medii Aevi Skandinavien) (in German). Stockholm: Kungl. Vitterhets-, historie- och antikvitetsakademien (Royal Swedish Academy of Letters, History and Antiquities). OCLC 463144909.
- Roosval, Johnny (1950). Gotländsk vitriarius (in Swedish). Stockholm: Generalstabens litografiska anstalts förlag. OCLC 504741730.
