= Arrie Church =

- Arrie kyrka
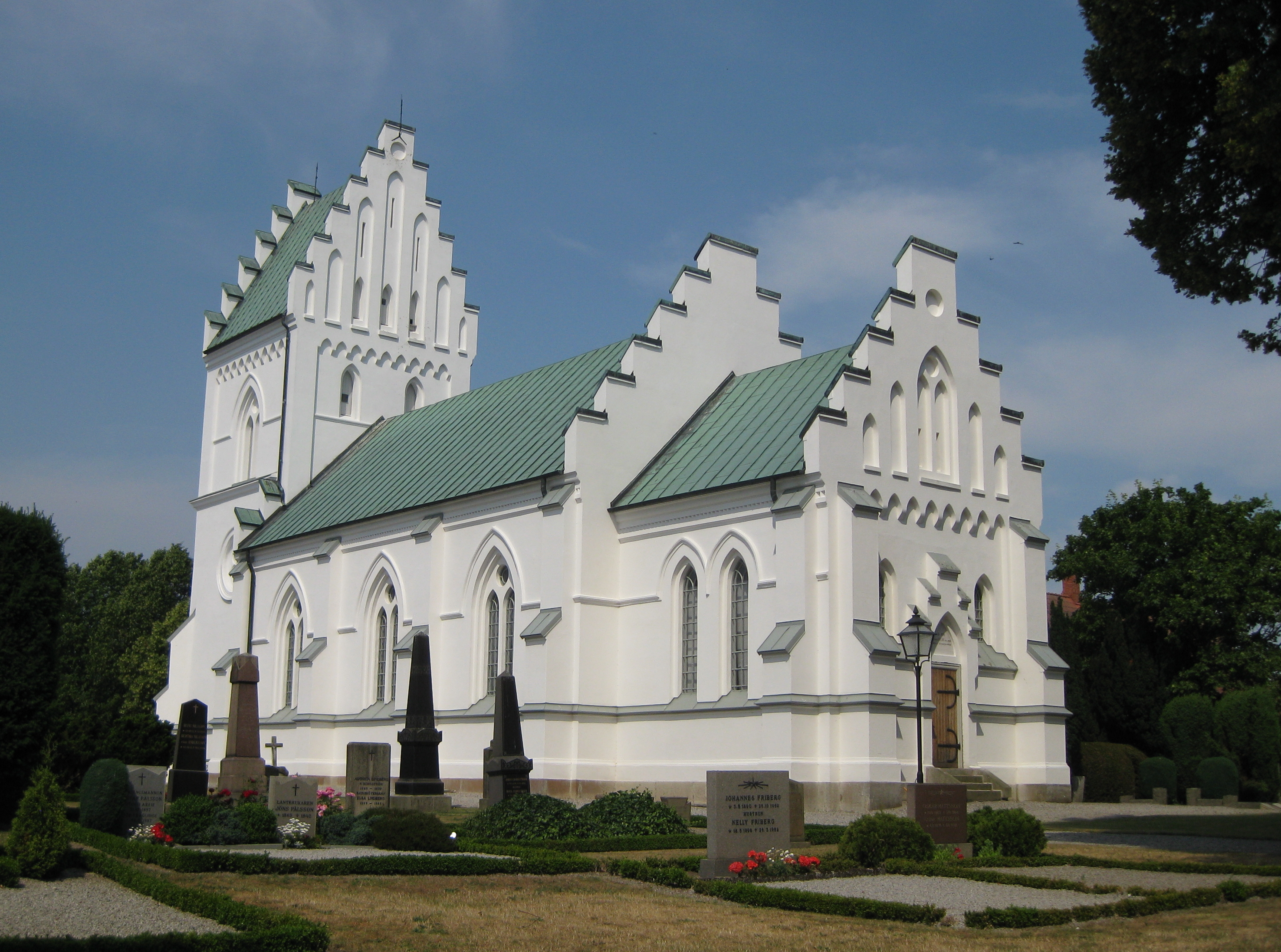
- Arrie Church

- 55°30′55″N 13°05′05″E
- Country: Sweden
- Denomination: Church of Sweden

Administration
- Diocese: Lund

Arrie Church (Swedish: Arrie kyrka) is a church in Arrie, Vellinge Municipality, in the Swedish province Skåne (Scania). A medieval church on the same spot was demolished in 1899 and the currently visible church inaugurated in 1890. It is a Neo-Gothic church, designed by architect Salomon Sörensen. Arrie Church houses a 15th-century wooden sculpture probably made in the Low Countries.

== History ==
The first church in Arrie was built c. 1200 and consisted of a nave, choir and an apse. During the 14th century a tower was added. The church underwent further changes during the 18th and 19th centuries. At the end of the 19th century, it was, however, decided that the old church should be demolished and a new one be built, despite objections from the Royal Swedish Academy of Letters, History and Antiquities. In 1889 everything except the lower part of the tower was torn down, and in 1890 the new church was inaugurated. Already in 1912 it had to be repaired.

== Architecture and furnishings ==
The current church was designed by architect Salomon Sörensen in a Neo-Gothic style. It consists of a western tower, a nave and a choir without an apse. Inside, the church ceiling is supported by vaults. The exterior is richly articulated with i.a. crow-stepped gables, mouldings and blind arches.

The pulpit was transferred from the old church and dates from the late 16th century; it is made of oak and decorated with carved images of Paul the Apostle and the Four Evangelists. The altarpiece consists of a wooden pietà, originally part of a larger altarpiece. It dates from the last quarter of the 15th century and was probably made in the Low Countries. It displays similarities with the triumphal cross of Barsebäck Church, somewhat further north, and has been described as being a piece of art of high artistic quality. The baptismal font also comes from the earlier church; it is made of wood and dates from the 16th century. The church has two church bells, of these one is from 1594 and the other manufactured in 1899.
