= Ari: My Life with a King =

- 2015 MMFF New Wave theatrical release poster
- Directed by: Carlo Encisco Catu
- Written by: Robby Tantingco
- Produced by: Ferdinan Lapuz; Carlo Mendoza
- Starring: Ronwaldo Martin; Francisco Guinto; Cecille Yumul; Chloe Carpio; Jonalyn Ablong
- Cinematography: Carlo Mendoza
- Edited by: Carlo Francisco Manatad
- Music by: Jake Abella
- Production companies: Center for Kapampangan Studies; CMB Film Studios
- Release dates: September 9, 2015 (Harlem); December 17, 2015 (Philippines)
- Running time: 89 minutes
- Country: Philippines
- Language: Kapampangan
- Budget: ₱1 million

Ari: My Life with a King is a 2015 Philippine independent film by Carlo Encisco Catu about a Kapampangan high school student learning about his native language from a Kapampangan-language poet.

== Premise ==
Jaypee (Ronwaldo Martin), a high school student, was tasked to find one of his school's famed alumni. His search leads him to a remote village where the ash from the 1991 eruption of Mount Pinatubo still covers the community. There he meets Conrado (Francisco Guinto) and a group of old poet who continues their efforts in preserving Pampanga's literary traditions.

== Cast ==
- Ronwaldo Martin as Jaypee; a Kapampangan youth who is not a native speaker of the Kapampangan. Ronwaldo is Coco Martin's younger brother.
- Francisco Guinto as Conrado; an older Kapampangan man who is known as the "King of Poets" in Pampanga. He teaches Jaypee the Kapampangan language. Guinto, like his character, is a Kampampangan poet as well.
- Cecille Yumul as Miding
- Chloe Carpio as Tintin
- Jonalyn Ablong as Marlyn

The cast also includes poets Policarpio Batac as Tatang Haspe, Eufrocina de la Peña as Apung Ciniang, and Felix Garcia as Tatang Gili

== Production ==
Ari (which means "King" in Kapampangan) was a venture of the Center for Kapampangan Studies (CKS). It was directed by Carlo Enciso Catu, a hotel and restaurant management student at the Holy Angel University (HAU). The production team consist of HAU's students, staff, officials and alumni. HAU also allocated ₱1 million for Ari.

Set in Porac, Pampanga, Ari was produced as a means to promote awareness on the Kapampangans status as dying language as well as its usage among younger people. It is also inspired from the tradition of Kapampangan poets' of selecting a "king" among themselves. The cast for the film also had Kapampangan poets as members including Batac, de la Peña, Garcia, and Guinto.

The CKS remarked that the film was finished within a week by an "all-amateur" team. The film did have involvement of professionals who offered services at a discounted rate as well as some volunteers.

== Release ==
Ari was screened at the 2015 Harlem International Film Festival, the 2015 Vancouver International Film Festival, and the 2015 All Lights India International Film Festival. The film was also screened in select cinemas in the Philippines from December 17 to 24, 2015 as one of the New Wave entries for the 2015 Metro Manila Film Festival. The film was also among the 170 films made available for streaming at the online 2020 Pista ng Pelikulang Pilipino.

== Awards ==
Award	Category	Recipient	Result
10th Harlem International Film Festival	Best World Film	Ari: My Life with a King	Won
1st All Lights India International Film Festival	Best Debut Director Award	Carlo Encisco Catu	Won
41st Metro Manila Film Festival Awards	New Wave Full-Length Best Actor	Francisco Quinto	Won
39th Gawad Urian Awards	Best Music	Jake Abella	Won
39th Gawad Urian Awards	Best Screenplay	Robby Tantingco	Won
39th Gawad Urian Awards	Best Film	Ari: My Life with a King	Nominated
39th Gawad Urian Awards	Best Direction	Carlo Encisco Catu	Nominated
39th Gawad Urian Awards	Best Actor	Francisco Guinto	Nominated
39th Gawad Urian Awards	Best Supporting Actress	Cecile Yumul	Nominated
39th Gawad Urian Awards	Best Editing	Carlo Francisco Manatad	Nominated
39th Gawad Urian Awards	Best Sound	Gilbert Obispo	Nominated
8th International Filmmaker Festival of World Cinema	Talented New Director Award	Carlo Encisco Catu	Won
8th International Filmmaker Festival of World Cinema	Best Foreign Language Film	Ari: My Life with a King	Nominated
8th International Filmmaker Festival of World Cinema	Best Actor for a Foreign Language Film	Ronwaldo Martin	Nominated
8th International Filmmaker Festival of World Cinema	Best Original Screenplay for a Foreign Language Film	Robby Tantingco	Nominated
8th International Filmmaker Festival of World Cinema	Best Editing for a Foreign Language Film	Carlo Francisco Manatad	Nominated
