= Fröjel Church =

- Fröjels kyrka
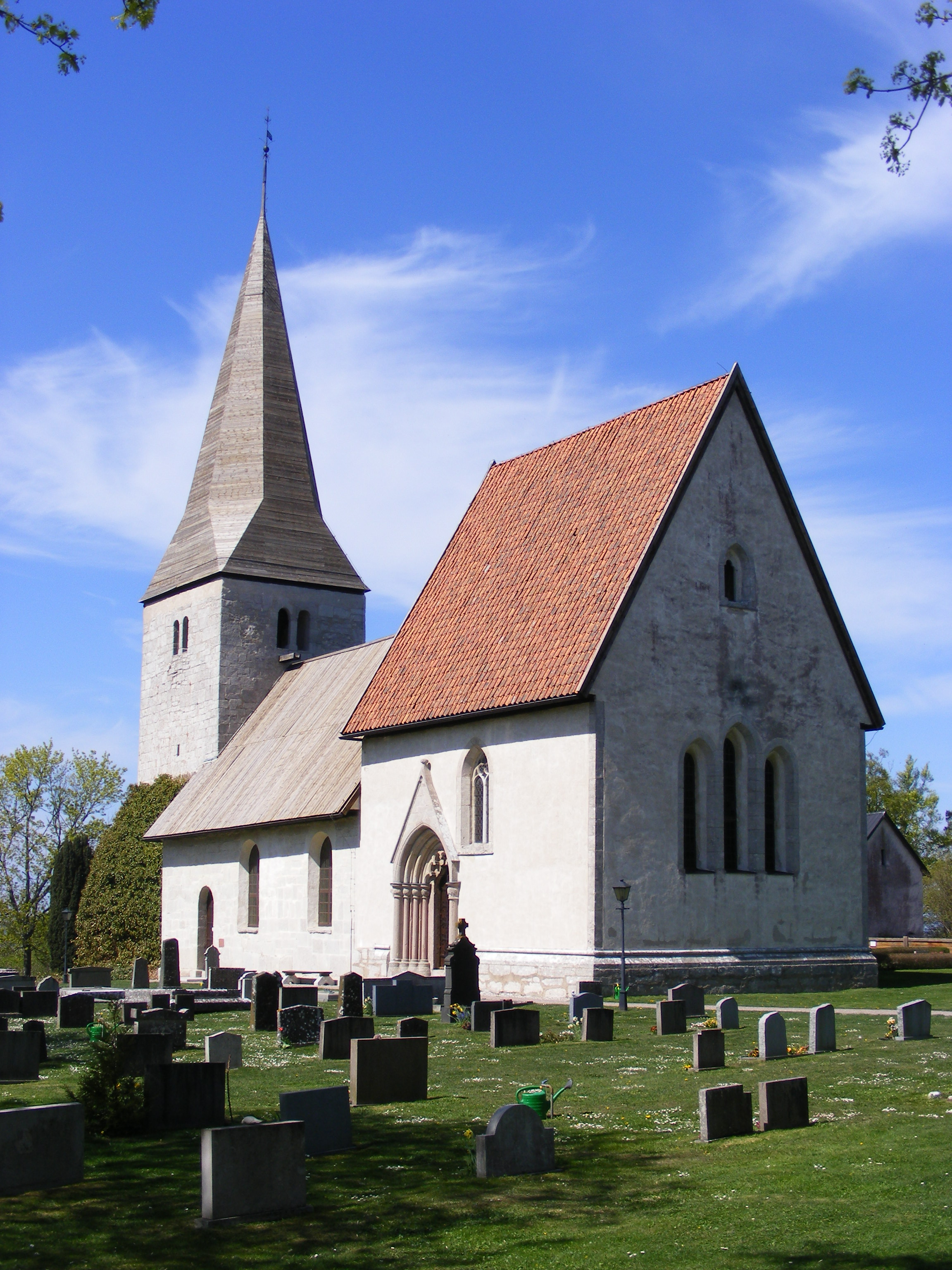
- Fröjel Church, view of the exterior

- Location on Gotland
- 57°20′08″N 18°11′23″E
- Country: Sweden
- Denomination: Church of Sweden

Administration
- Diocese: Visby

Fröjel Church (Swedish: Fröjels kyrka) is a medieval church in Fröjel on the Swedish island of Gotland. Fröjel Church may have been built to serve not only as a church, but also as a fortification. Stylistically, it is a mix of Romanesque and Gothic architecture, and contains murals from the early 14th century. It is associated with the Diocese of Visby of the Church of Sweden.

== History and architecture ==
The church was probably built not only as a house of worship but also as a place of refuge in times of danger or conflict. The location on a high point not far from the sea is fortress-like, and close to the church lies the ruins of a defensive tower, dating from the Middle Ages. The church was built close to a pre-Christian maze or Troy Town indicating an ancient site.

The church was constructed of limestone. The oldest part of the church itself, the nave, dates from the late 12th century. The tower is somewhat later, while the large choir is from circa 1300, and in Gothic style rather than the Romanesque of the rest of the church. The intention was probably that the whole church should be rebuilt in Gothic style but for some reason only the choir was rebuilt.

The interior of the church displays several medieval murals, depicting dragons, deer, lions and griffins, as well as an angel and a bishop. The murals date from the early 14th century. The base of the baptismal font is made by the master sculptor Byzantios, while the upper part of the font is from the 14th century. There is also a large medieval triumphal cross in Fröjel church. Later additions to the inventory include the altarpiece and the pulpit, both from the 17th century.

It is associated with the Diocese of Visby of the Church of Sweden.
