= Astrophysics Research Institute =

Research institute in Merseyside, England

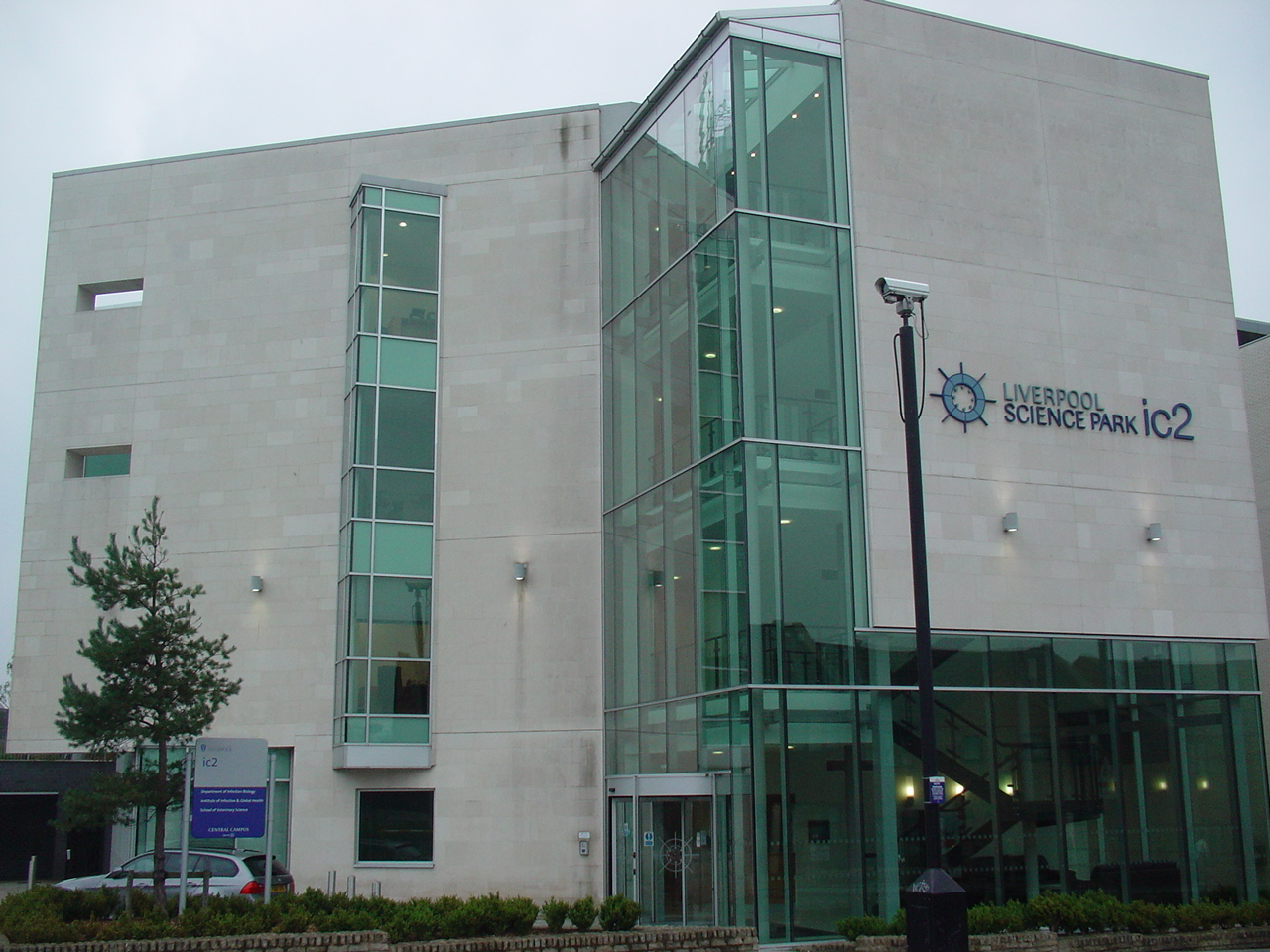
- Liverpool Science Park, the institute's current location
- Type: Astronomy and Astrophysics
- Established: 1992; 34 years ago
- Affiliations: Liverpool John Moores University; Liverpool Telescope (LT)
- Director: Ian McCarthy
- Location: Liverpool, England
- Colours: university colours Navy blue Lime green faculty colours (Faculty of Engineering and Technology)
- Website: Astrophysics Research Institute

The Astrophysics Research Institute (ARI) is an astronomy and astrophysics research institute in Merseyside, UK. Formed in 1992, it stood on the Twelve Quays site in Birkenhead from 1998 until June 2013 when it relocated to the Liverpool Science Park in Liverpool. It is in the top 1% of institutions in the field of space science as measured by total citations.

Currently there are over 90 staff members and research students working at the institute, which lies within the administration of the Liverpool John Moores University's Faculty of Engineering and Technology.

== Research ==
The research conducted at the Institute covers many areas of astronomy and astrophysics, such as supernovae, star formation and galaxy clusters. This work is funded by external organisations, such as the Science and Technology Facilities Council, and the Higher Education Funding Council for England. The institute also maintains the Liverpool Telescope which is located on the island of La Palma in the Canary Islands.

== Education ==
The institute currently offers two undergraduate courses: a 3-year BSc (Hons) in Physics and Astronomy, as well as a 4-year MPhys (Hons) in Astrophysics. Both the undergraduate courses are taught as a joint degree by the Astrophysics Research Institute of Liverpool John Moores University and the Department of Physics at the University of Liverpool. The courses are accredited by the Institute of Physics.

Postgraduate courses are made available at PhD and Master's level, with two MSc courses taught via distance learning.

Unaccredited short courses are also made available to those who do not have a scientific or mathematical background. The Astronomy by Distance Learning courses are taught by CD-ROM, DVD and website material without the need for classroom sessions. Each of the courses provides an introduction to astronomy as well as to specialist areas such as supernovae.

== Awards ==
In 2006, the institute received the "Queen's Anniversary Prize" for higher education in recognition for its development of the robotic telescope. In 2007, the "Times Higher Education Supplement Award" for 'project of the year' was given for the use of the RINGO optical polarimeter at the Liverpool Telescope in measuring gamma-ray bursts. RINGO has since been decommissioned and an updated polarimeter named MOPTOP has since entered operation.

== Director ==
Term	Director
1992–2005	Prof. Mike Bode
2005–2008	Prof. Chris Collins (interim)
2008–2014	Prof. Mike Bode
2014–2019	Prof. Chris Collins
2019–2020	Prof. Phil James
2020–2021	Prof. Ian McCarthy (interim)
2021–2022	Prof. Phil James
2022-present	Prof. Ian McCarthy
