= Mount Alfred (Otago) =

Hill in Otago, New Zealand

Mount Alfred / Ari
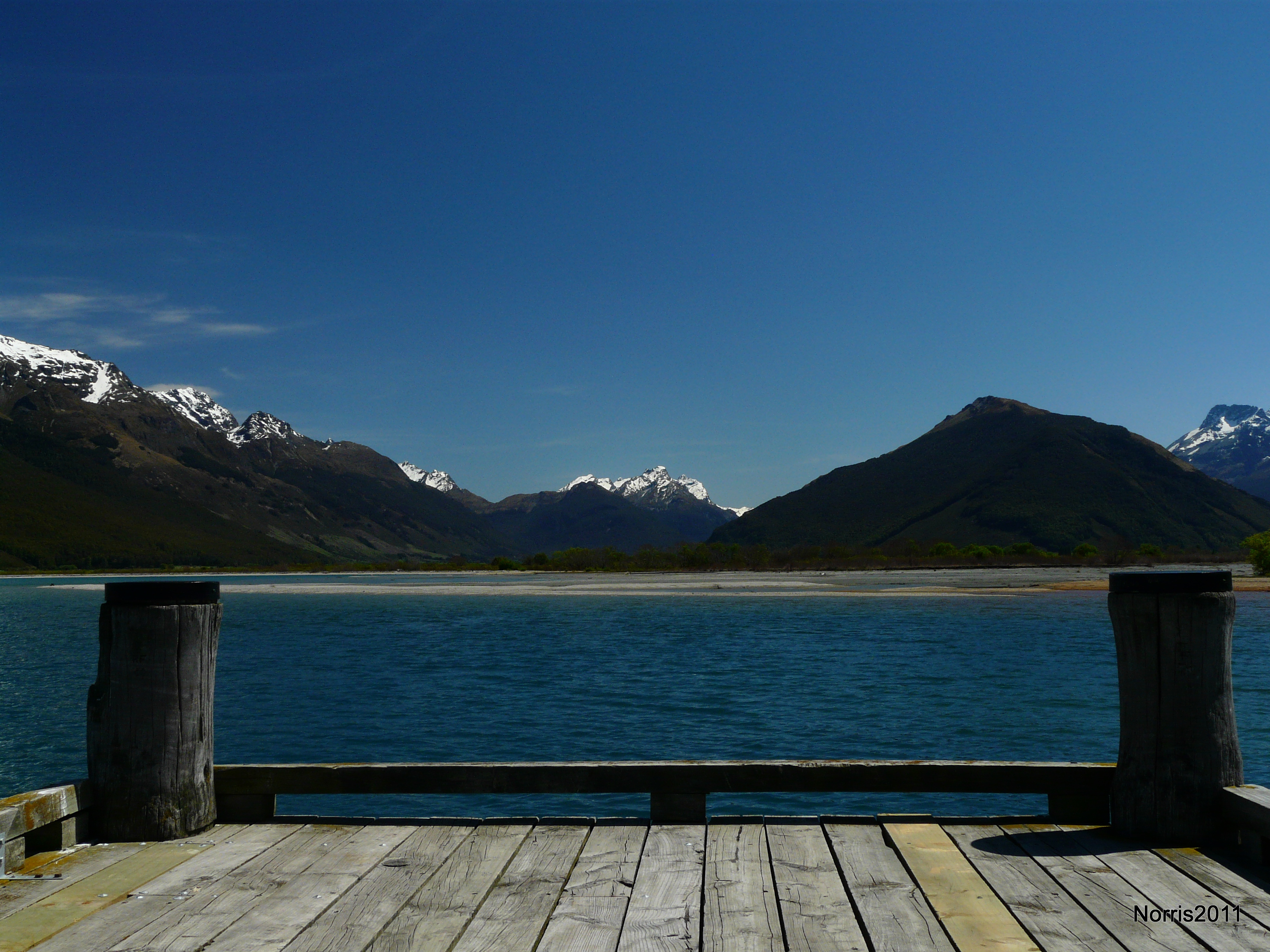
- Mount Alfred / Ari centre right (dark foreground pyramid) as viewed from the Jetty at Glenorchy

Highest point
- Elevation: 1,375 m (4,511 ft)
- Parent peak: Mount Earnslaw / Pikirakatahi
- Coordinates: 44.7576°S 168.3612°E

Naming
- Etymology: Alfred H. Duncan
- Native name: Ari (Māori)
- English translation: "visible"
- Defining authority: New Zealand Geographic Board

Geography
- Country: New Zealand
- Region: Otago
- District: Queenstown-Lakes

Mount Alfred (officially Mount Alfred / Ari) is a hill in Otago, New Zealand, that was formed by glaciers during the last ice age. It is the prominent hill due north from Glenorchy located between the Dart River / Te Awa Whakatipu and Rees River located in the Queenstown-Lakes District.

It was featured in a 2016 Tourism New Zealand video, in which film producer James Cameron visited the location.
