= Wechselburg Priory =

Monastery

Coordinates: 51°00′18″N 12°46′16″E

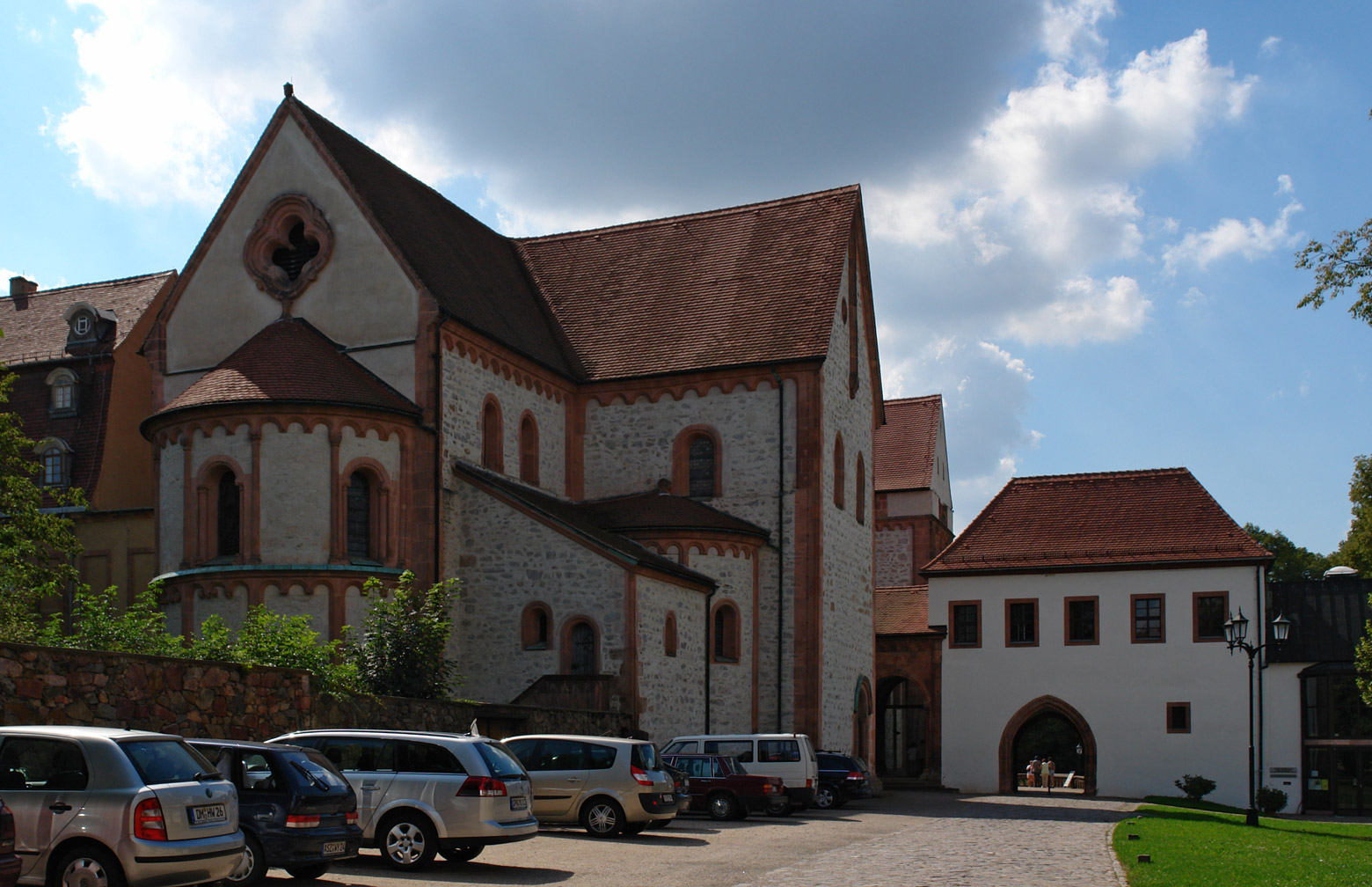
Abbey Church

Wechselburg Priory, formerly Wechselburg Abbey (Kloster Wechselburg) is a Benedictine priory in Wechselburg in Saxony, dissolved in the 16th century and re-founded in 1993.

== First foundation ==
Dedo V of Wettin founded the monastery, dedicated in 1168. Henry the Illustrious, Margrave of Meissen made a gift of it in 1278 to the Teutonic Order. In 1543 the abbey with all its possessions came into the hands of the territorial prince, Maurice, Elector of Saxony. It was eventually dissolved in 1570.

== Castle ==
After the Thirty Years' War (1618–48) the lords of Schönburg built a Baroque castle (Schloss Wechselburg) on the foundations of the ruined abbey, which remained in the same family until their dispossession in 1945.

== Second foundation ==
After the end of World War II the abbey church became the parish church and also a place of pilgrimage. In 1993 Benedictine monks from Ettal Abbey re-founded Wechselburg as a priory. Although the community is still small, they run a youth and family centre and are involved in pastoral care and managing the pilgrimages.

Because of its dependency on Ettal, Wechselburg is the only non-Bavarian monastery to be a member of the Bavarian Congregation of the Benedictine Confederation.

== Basilica ==
The Romanesque basilica of the Holy Cross remains as the parish church. It is famous for its huge and intricately carved mediaeval rood screen.
