= Arry =

Arry is the name of the following communes in France:

- Arry, Moselle, in the Moselle department
- Arry, Somme, in the Somme department

'Arry is also a nickname, an example of H dropping in the name Harry. Those with such a nickname include:

- Harry Redknapp, former English footballer and football manager
