= Havor Hoard =

Iron Age treasure found in Sweden

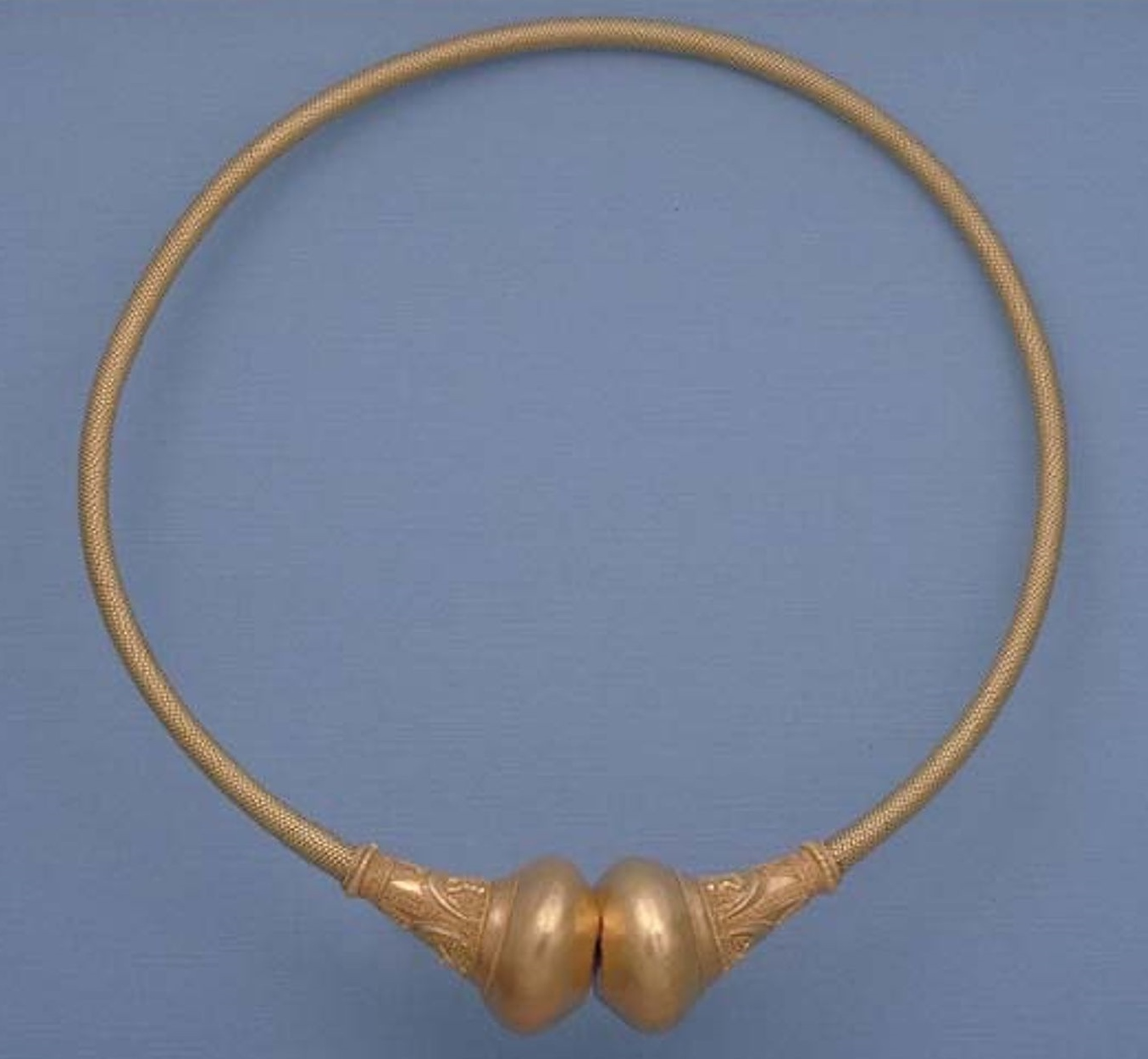
The Havor Ring

The Havor hoard (Swedish: Havorskatten) is an Iron Age treasure found in 1961, in Hablingbo on the Swedish island of Gotland. It consists of a large gold torc, known as the Havor Ring, along with several well-preserved bronze objects and was buried inside a Roman bronze situla in the mound surrounding a hillfort.

In 1986, the Havor Ring was stolen from the Gotland Museum. As of 2025, it has not been recovered.

== Location ==
The hillfort in the small village of Havor in Hablingbo is located in a meadow about 700 m (2,300 ft) northeast of the main building at Stora Havor farm. The fort was built more than 2000 years ago during the Pre-Roman Iron Age. At that time it was situated on the south banks of the lake that later became Mästermyr mire. The hillfort is surrounded by a round mound or wall 55 m (180 ft) in diameter, about 1 m (3.3 ft) high and 7–8 m (23–26 ft) wide. On top of the mound, there are traces of a wooden palisade and outside it are traces of a grave. Close by are also a couple of Iron Age house foundations and in one of these seven denarii minted in 112–192 AD were found. Archaeological excavations of the area in 1961–80, revealed that the site had been continuously inhabited from the Bronze Age until the Middle Ages.

== Discovery ==
The hoard was discovered on the first day of an archaeological excavation in April 1961, by a couple of workers who were removing turf from the mound around the hillfort. The excavation was a relief work project provided by Havdhem Municipality. Two men found a vessel containing several objects and "something that looked like gold" under a flat stone on the inside of the mound. As there was no archaeologist present that day, they put the stone back and shoveled some dirt over it and continued to dig elsewhere. The next day archaeologists took control of the site and police had to keep press, TV crews and spectators at bay. The excavation supervisor, then archaeology student Peter Manneke, was credited with the find. Manneke phoned his boss, professor Erik Nylén, who was in Stockholm at the time and he immediately flew to Gotland. To guard the find Manneke and Nylén spent the night in sleeping bags by the hoard.

The hoard was brought to Gotland Museum where it went on public display in the Treasury (Skattkammaren) for the next 25 year. At first it was displayed in a custom built iron case with armored glass and in the mid 1980s it was moved to an ordinary glass alarmed showcase.

== Find ==
The find consisted of a large Roman bronze vessel with a handle, a situla, which held a large gold torc, four Roman wine cups resembling modern tastevins, a bronze strainer and two bronze bells. The hoard was from about 100 AD and all the objects were exceptionally well preserved. On the handle of the situla were stamps reading "TOR, CANNIMASUIT, (P CI)PI POLYB and IPI(?)". The two bells were tied together with leather straps into a rattle.

No official archaeological report was written on the Havor hoard or the excavation of the site at the time of the find.

=== Havor Ring ===
The gold torc, known as the Havor Ring (Havorringen) was made in the 1st century. It, along with other neck rings of this kind, were previously believed to be of western Celtic or southeast European origin, but it is now concluded that the Havor Ring could have been made in the Nordic countries. As of 2016, it is the earliest known well-dated major gold ornament in the Germanic north. The torc is 257 mm (10.1 in) in diameter and weighs close to 800 grams (1.8 lb), with a gold value of about SEK 40,000–50,000 in 2006. However, the value of the neck ring as a historic art object is estimated at tens of million SEK. A copy of it was made for a display at the Swedish History Museum in Stockholm.

Because of its size, the torc is considered a unique object. It is too large to be worn by a person and it is believed to have adorned a statue of a deity and was part of a treasure belonging to a temple. Five similar but smaller torcs have been found; one in Trollhättan, one in a bog on Jutland, two near Kyiv and one at Olbia by the Black Sea.

The Havor Ring is the most richly decorated and technically most complicated of the six torcs with a ring-body made from several twisted gold wires figure-8-shaped filigree ornamentation on the cones by the claps orbs. The gold wires of the ring section were twisted around a core-rod which was later removed. This made the torc very flexible when opening and closing the clasp mechanism hidden within the front orbs. The cones on the front of the ring are decorated with bullheads and half-moons made of gold sheet, surrounded by small gold grains and twisted gold wires in a filigree pattern.

==== Theft ====
On 18 June 1986, the Havor Ring was stolen during visiting hours from the Gotland Museum. The circumstances of the theft have been described as "mysterious". On that day, the alarm in the Treasury was activated twice. After the first time, at 12 pm, the antiquarian in charge of security found everything in order and the alarm was reset. At 12:45 pm the alarm went off again. This time the antiquarian noticed that a latch on the lock was recessed, meaning that the showcase was unlocked, but she did not notice that the torc was gone. She locked the case and reset the alarm again. The theft was discovered at noon the next day. According to the police, the lock had been picked or opened with a key.

The police immediately sent out a nationwide alert about the missing torc and contacted Interpol. A SEK 25,000 reward was offered for information leading to the recovery of the neck ring. A young man who had been seen in the Treasury was suspected of the theft, but he was never found. In the late 1990s, the crime was investigated on the Swedish TV show Efterlyst ("Wanted"). Several persons have been interviewed and investigated about the crime over the years but without results. The theft is now prescribed but even if the police have no ongoing investigation about it, tips from the public are still coming into the Visby police department. Since 2015, two private investigators have been looking for the torc; a former intelligence agent and a forensic scientist, both retired. Their focus has been on a former employee at the museum – a now deceased archaeologist who was convicted of multiple antiquities thefts and sentenced to psychiatric care after having been diagnosed with kleptomania.

About a year after the theft, a copy of the torc was made from the copy at the History Museum. As of 2016, that second copy is displayed in the Gotland Museum along with the bronze objects from the hoard.

== See also ==
- Spillings Hoard
