= Aa Church =

Church in Capital Region, Denmark

Coordinates: 55°04′14″N 14°55′09″E

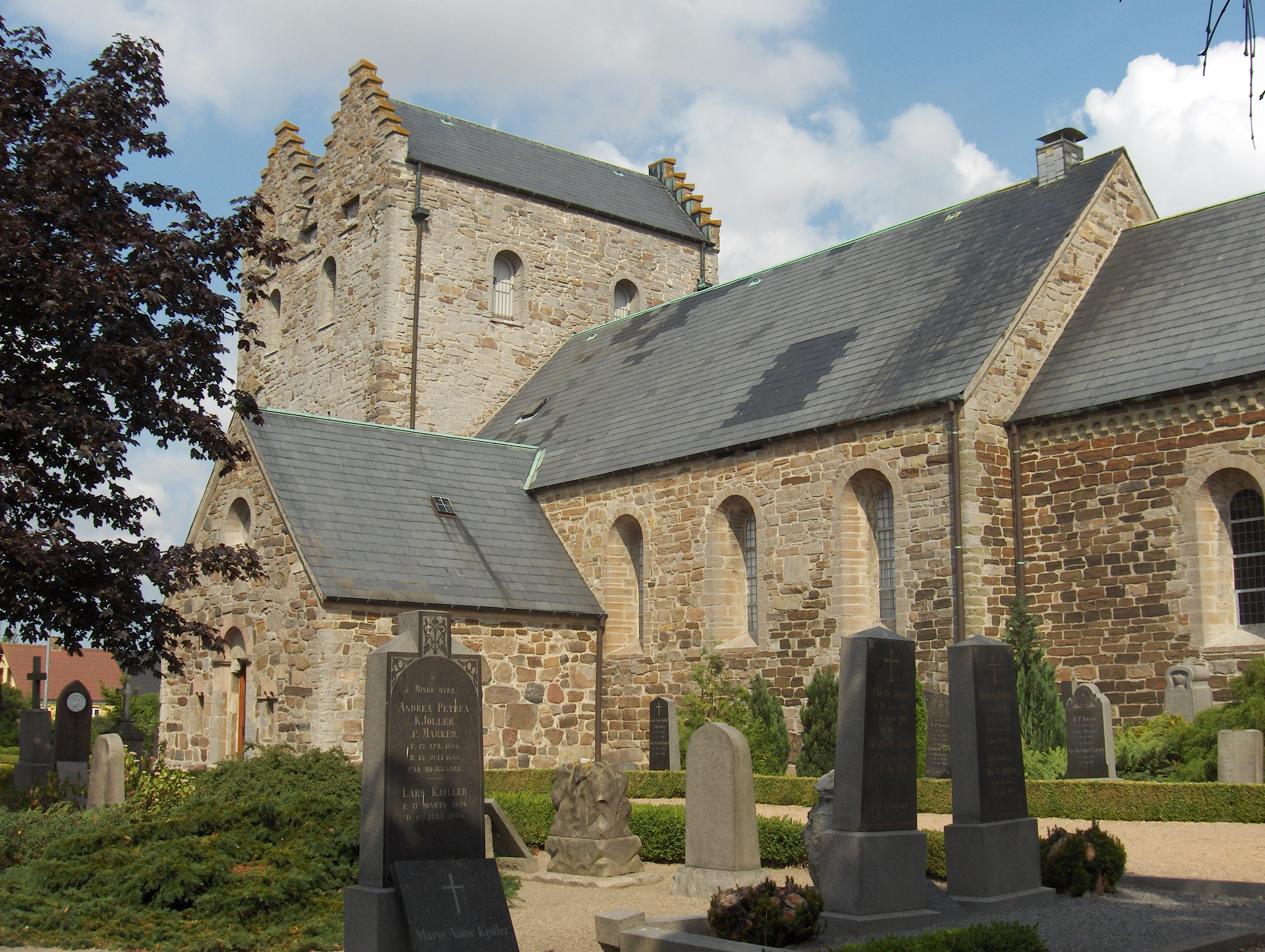
Aa Church, Bornholm

Aa Church (Danish: Aa kirke), located in Aakirkeby on the Danish island of Bornholm, is a Romanesque church dating from the 12th century. It is the parish church of Aaker Parish.

== History and architecture ==
Aa Church, which literally means "stream church", owes its name to the two streams which run beside it. Dedicated to John the Baptist, it was first known as Sankt Hans kirke (St John's Church). A gilded figure of St John stood in the church until 1706 but was buried in the churchyard by the priest as it was attracting undue attention from Catholic prisoners during the Great Northern War.

The church was built in the latter half of the 12th century in several stages. The oldest remaining sections are the choir and apse and the lower parts of the nave, all characterized by greenish sandstone and rust-brown shale from nearby Grødby Stream. The western end of the nave and the tower are made of limestone. The men's door to the south and the women's door to the north have both been preserved although the latter has been transformed into a window.

The tower was originally narrower on the western side but was already widened to its current dimensions of 13 by 11 metres during the Romanesque period. With its four floors, it reaches a height of 22 metres. The twin roofs from the 14th century probably replaced a four-sided pyramid. The bells now hang here although they were originally housed in the Bornholm fashion in a separate bell tower to the south of the church. The vaulted rooms in the tower were once used to store foodstuffs. The porch of Nexø sandstone, the oldest on Bornholm, is slightly more recent than the tower but still dates to the Romanesque period around 1200–1235.

The nave is large and light with a flat wooden ceiling. The vaulted ceiling from the Gothic period c. 1350 is supported by four rectangular corner pillars. It was earlier divided into two by arcade walls and had a gallery for the nobles from the now ruined Lilleborg Castle. During major restoration work in 1874, the arcade walls were torn down giving the church its present shape. Further restoration was carried out in 1968.

The altarpiece and pulpit date from 1603, probably the work of the sculptor Johan Ottho from Lund. With 11 scenes of Jesus' life, the sandstone font from 1200 is ascribed to the Gotland sculptor Sigraf.

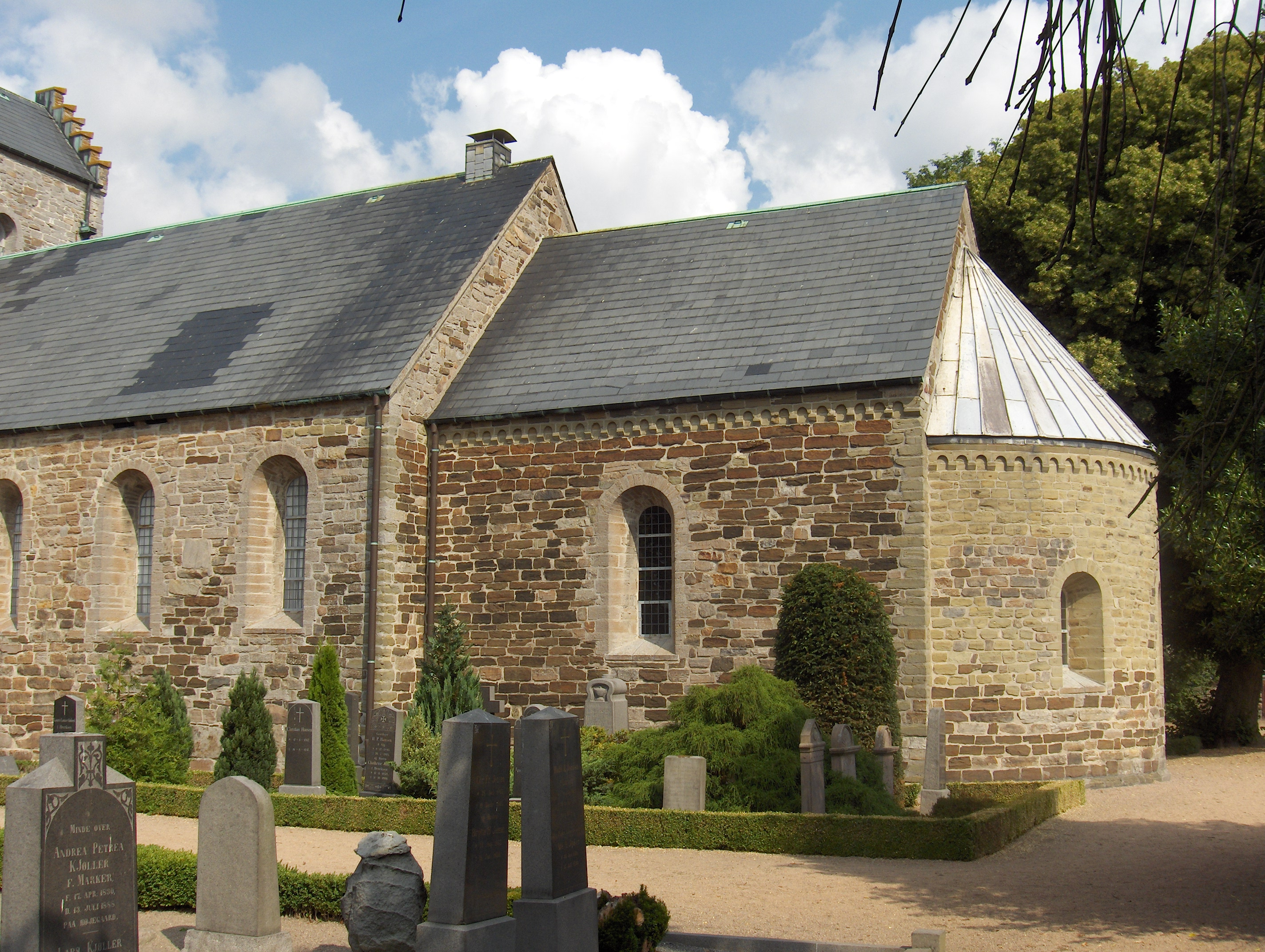
Romanesque choir and apse

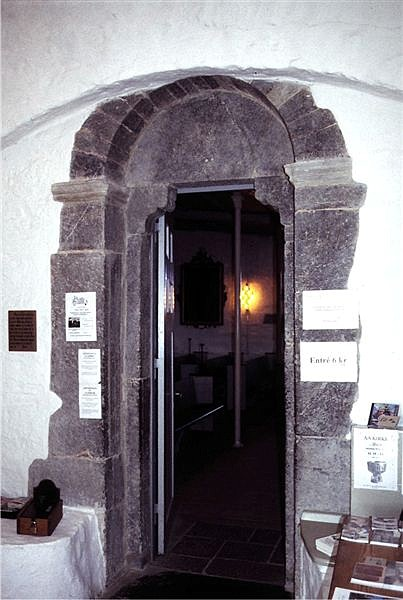
South door

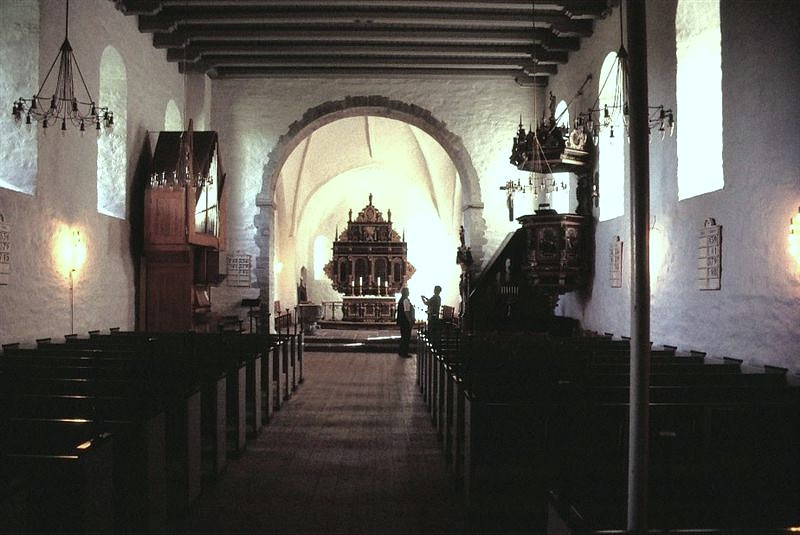
Nave

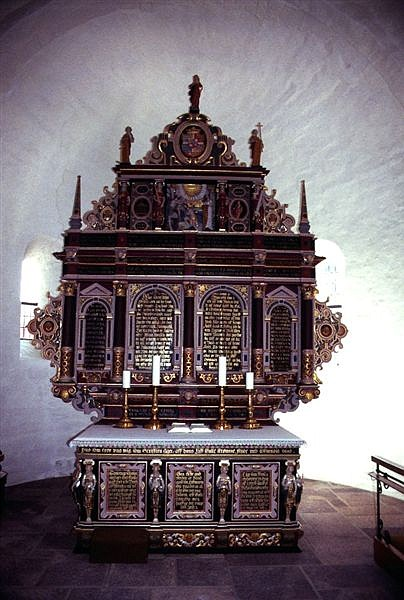
Altarpiece

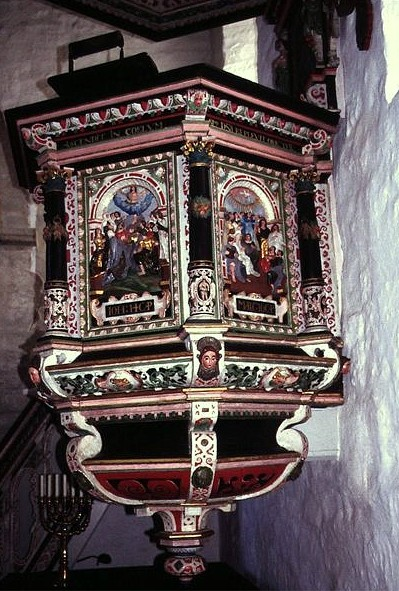
Pulpit

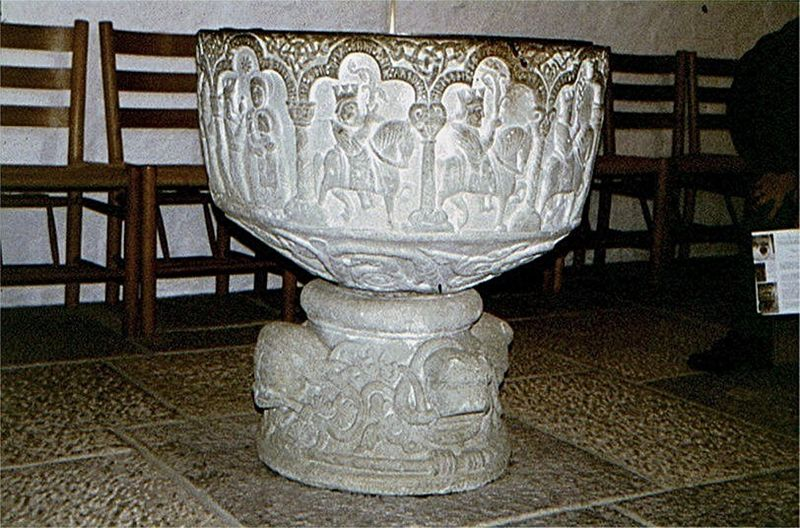
Font

== See also ==
- List of churches on Bornholm
