= Eke, Gotland =

Eke
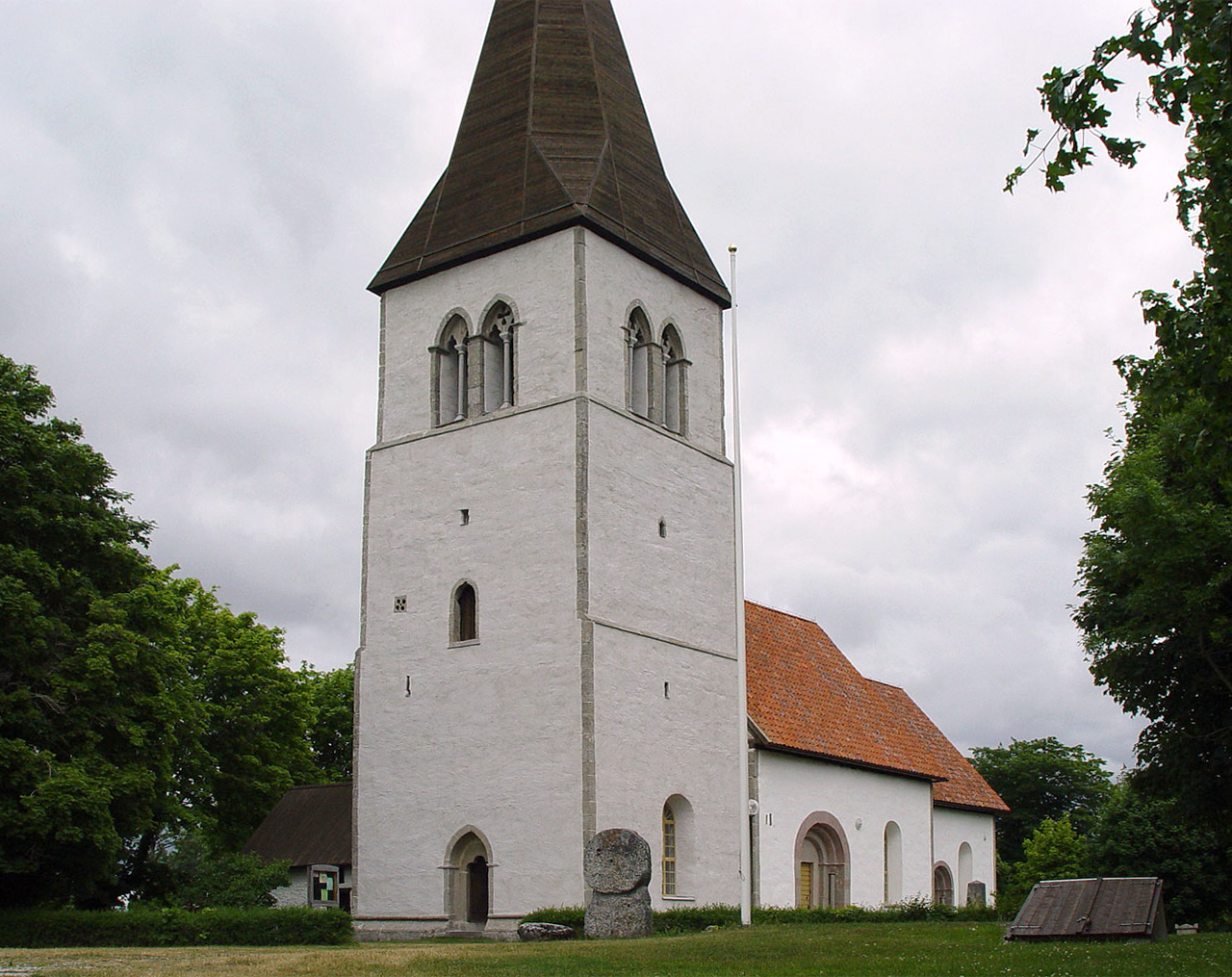
- Eke church

- Location within Gotland
- Coordinates: 57°10′4″N 18°22′44″E
- Country: Sweden
- Province: Gotland
- County: Gotland County
- Municipality: Gotland Municipality

Area
  - Total: 18.55 km^{2} (7.16 sq mi)

Population (2014)
  - Total: 63
- Time zone: UTC+1 (CET)
  - Summer (DST): UTC+2 (CEST)

Eke is a populated area, a socken (not to be confused with parish), on the Swedish island of Gotland. It comprises the same area as the administrative Eke District, established on 1 January 2016.

== Geography ==
Eke is situated in the southeast part of Gotland. The medieval Eke Church is located in the socken. As of 2019, Eke Church belongs to Havdhem parish in Sudrets pastorat, along with the churches in Havdhem, Näs, Grötlingbo, Hablingbo and Silte.

== History ==
The Guding hillfort in Eke was built during the Iron Age. The wall that encircles it is approximately 450 m (1,480 ft) long and the courtyard about 12,000 m^{2} (130,000 ft^{2}).
