= Pehr Arvid Säve =

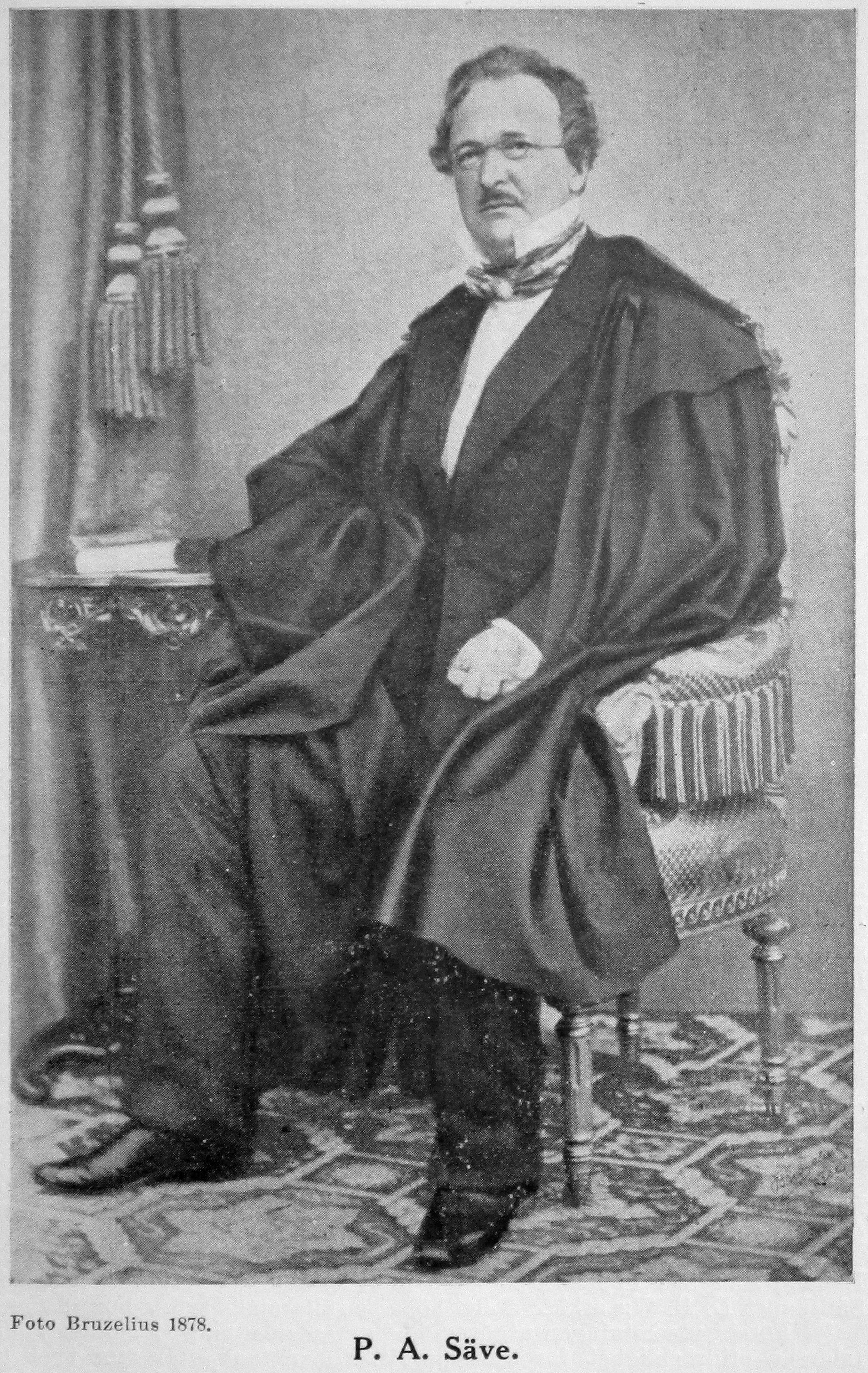
- Pehr Arvid Säve, 1878
- Born: Per Magnus Arvid Säve; 19 April 1811; Roma, Sweden
- Died: 10 November 1887 (aged 76); Visby, Sweden
- Resting place: Visby, Sweden
- Education: Uppsala University
- Occupations: Teacher, cultural historian and artist
- Known for: Gotland Museum
- Spouse: AnneLovisa Holmström
- Parent(s): Pehr Säve and Hedvig Lallerius

Pehr Magnus Arvid Säve (19 April 1811 – 10 November 1887) was a Swedish teacher, cultural historian and artist. He was the initiator of the Gotlands Fornvänner society and Gotland Museum.

== Early life and education ==
Säve was born in Roma the son of the provost there, Pehr Säve and his wife Hedvig Lallerius. Säve started out as a teacher in Visby 1835–57, and he soon became a pioneer for the Gotlandic cultural history.

== Career ==
On the behalf of the Royal Swedish Academy of Letters, History and Antiquities he collected facts about Gotland's heritage, language, geography and culture. He was the academy's curator of antiquities on Gotland and in Västergötland and Östergötland. His notes are collected in six large volumes in Uppsala University Library. Notes made by Säve and his brother, Carl Säve, resulted in a Gotlandic dictionary (Gotländsk ordbok) was published in Uppsala in 1936–45. He also gathered and wrote down Gotlandic traditional tales, which he called sagas. This comprehensive material included Strandens sagor (Tales from the beach) 1873, Åkerns sagor (Tales from the field) 1876 and Havets och fiskarens sagor (Tales from the sea and the fisherman) 1880. After his death, material from his notes and archive was included 1945 edition of Swedish folk tales and the 1949 edition of Swedish folk songs.

Säve was the initiator of the society Gotlands Fornvänner (the Friends of Gotland's Antiquity) and their Museum of Antiquities on Gotland, later renamed the Gotland Museum. He was also a pioneer in the field of conservation and protection of the natural environment. In 1877, he published a paper in which he propagated for a law regarding animal rights and animal welfare. That year he also received an honorary Ph.D. from Uppsala University. In 1882, he became an honorary member of the Swedish Heritage Society (Svenska fornminnesföreningen) and of the Royal Swedish Academy of Letters, History and Antiquities in 1885.

Säve died of pneumonia in 1887. He is buried at the Eastern cemetery in Visby.

== Legacy ==
A school in Visby, the Säve School (Säveskolan) is named after him. It is an equivalent of a high school, although that term is not used in Sweden.
