= Grötlingbo =

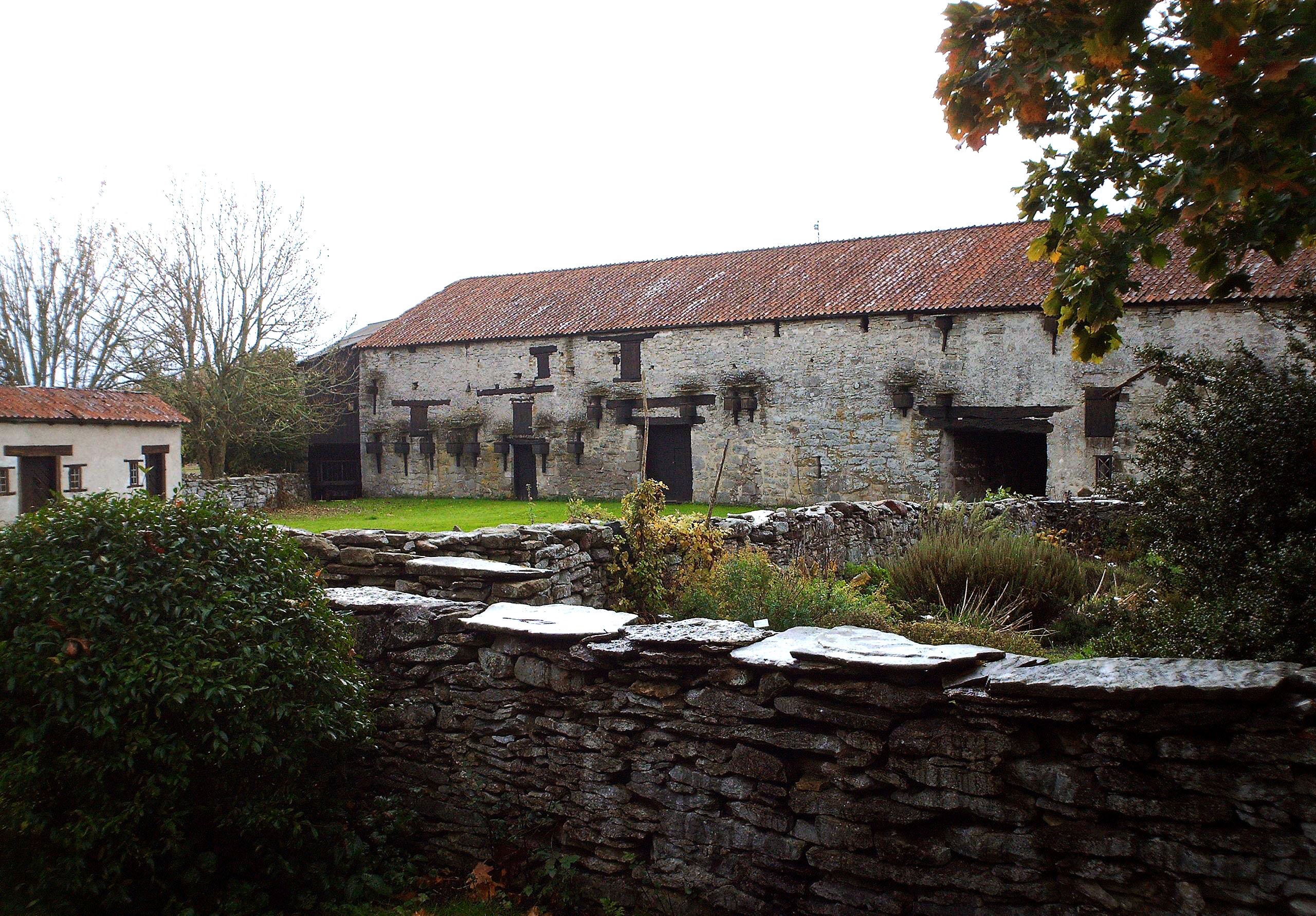
- Kattlund farm in Grötlingbo

- Location within Gotland
- Coordinates: 57°8′1″N 18°20′47″E
- Country: Sweden
- Province: Gotland
- County: Gotland County
- Municipality: Gotland Municipality

Area
  - Total: 34.66 km^{2} (13.38 sq mi)

Population (2014)
  - Total: 222
- Time zone: UTC+1 (CET)
  - Summer (DST): UTC+2 (CEST)

Grötlingbo is a populated area, a socken (not to be confused with parish), on the Swedish island of Gotland. It comprises the same area as the administrative Grötlingbo District, established on 1 January 2016.

The Kattlund farm in Grötlingbo is medieval. It is an open-air museum maintained by Gotland Museum where markets, jousting tournaments and private events are held.

== Geography ==
Grötlingbo is situated on the southeast coast of Gotland. The medieval Grötlingbo Church is located in the socken. As of 2019, Grötlingbo Church belongs to Havdhem parish in Sudrets pastorat, along with the churches in Havdhem, Näs, Eke, Hablingbo and Silte.

One of the asteroids in the asteroid belt, 10812 Grötlingbo, is named after this place.
