= Hablingbo =

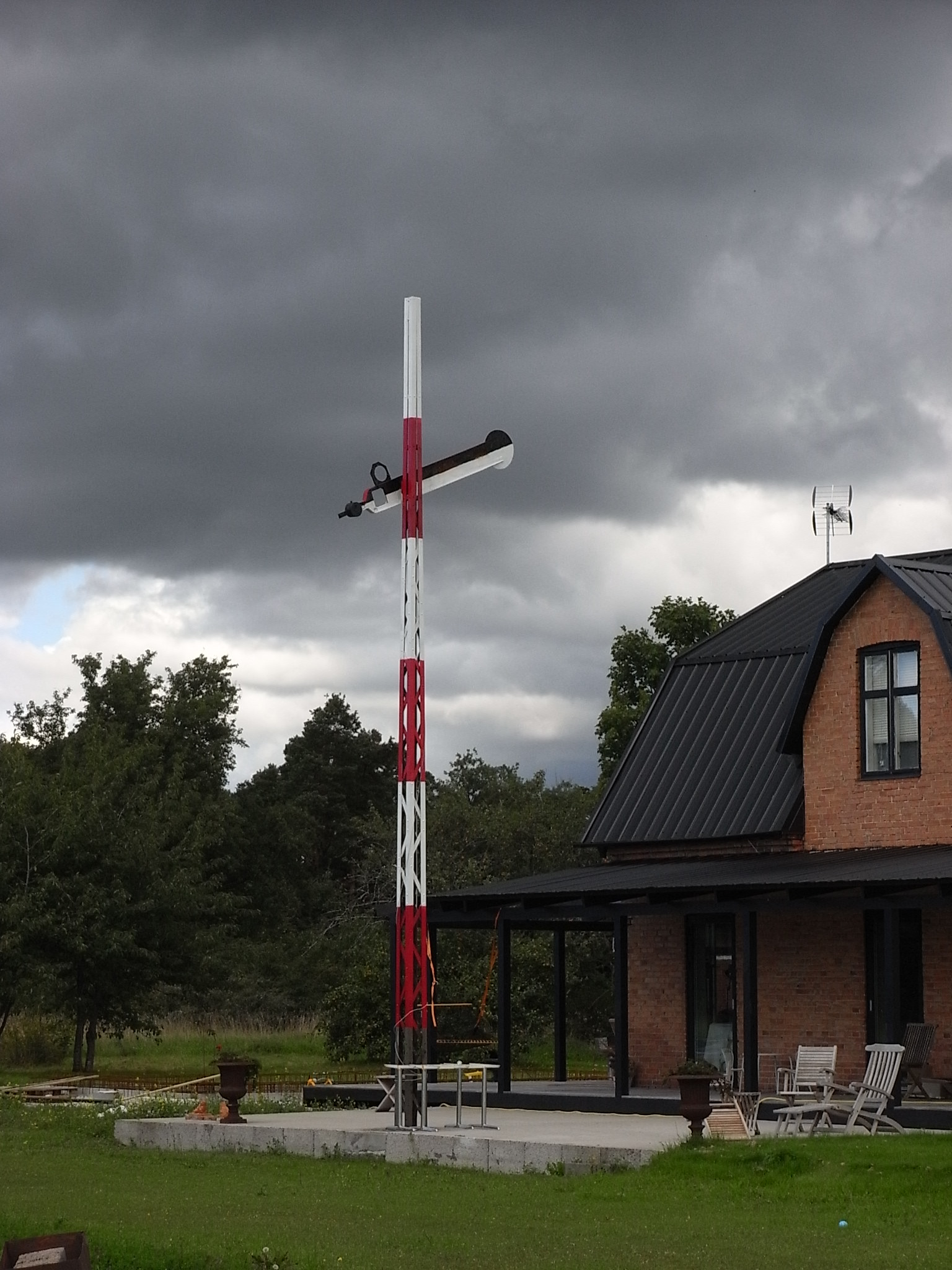
- Hablingbo train station

- Location within Gotland
- Coordinates: 57°11′14″N 18°15′45″E
- Country: Sweden
- Province: Gotland
- County: Gotland County
- Municipality: Gotland Municipality

Area
  - Total: 52 km^{2} (20 sq mi)

Population (2014)
  - Total: 247
- Time zone: UTC+1 (CET)
  - Summer (DST): UTC+2 (CEST)
- Website: hablingbo.info

Hablingbo (Swedish pronunciation: [ˈhâbːlɪŋˌbuː]) is a populated area, a socken (not to be confused with parish), on the Swedish island of Gotland. It comprises the same area as the administrative Hablingbo District, established on 1 January 2016.

In 1961, the Havor Hoard was found at a hillfort in the small village of Havor in Hablingbo.

== Geography ==
Hablingbo is the name of the socken as well as the district. It is also the name of the small village surrounding the medieval Hablingbo Church, sometimes referred to as Hablingbo kyrkby. It is situated on the southwest coast of Gotland. The area is rural with farming as the main source of income. Part of the farmed land is on the now drained Mästermyr mire. In the west, towards the coast, there are forests.

As of 2019, Hablingbo Church belongs to Havdhem parish in Sudrets pastorat, along with the churches in Havdhem, Näs, Grötlingbo, Eke, and Silte.

== History ==
The name of the socken is first mentioned in 1320 as Hagbardlingabo. The last part bo means "district". The first part haghbardhlingar is a combination of Medieval expressions, where inge means "indweller", and Hagbardh a combination of hagh meaning "enclosure" and bardh for "high ridge" which refers to the ridge the Hablingbo Church is built on. This gives "they who hold thing on Hagbardh as the meaning of haghbardhlingar.

In Hablingbo there are a couple of grave cairns from the Bronze Age as well as about a dozen smaller Iron Age grave fields plus one major at Havor. There are house foundations, stone walls, grooves and two hillsforts from the Iron Age. Two Viking silver treasures have been found in addition to the Havor Ring – one of Sweden's most unique gold finds. The present socken dates back to Medieval times.

The Petes farm built in the late 18th century, is still intact and since 1965, it is maintained by Gotland Museum as a museum farm.

At the beginning of the 20th century, Hablingbo was a station on one of the now discontinued railway lines on Gotland. The station house was built in 1920.
