= Havdhem =

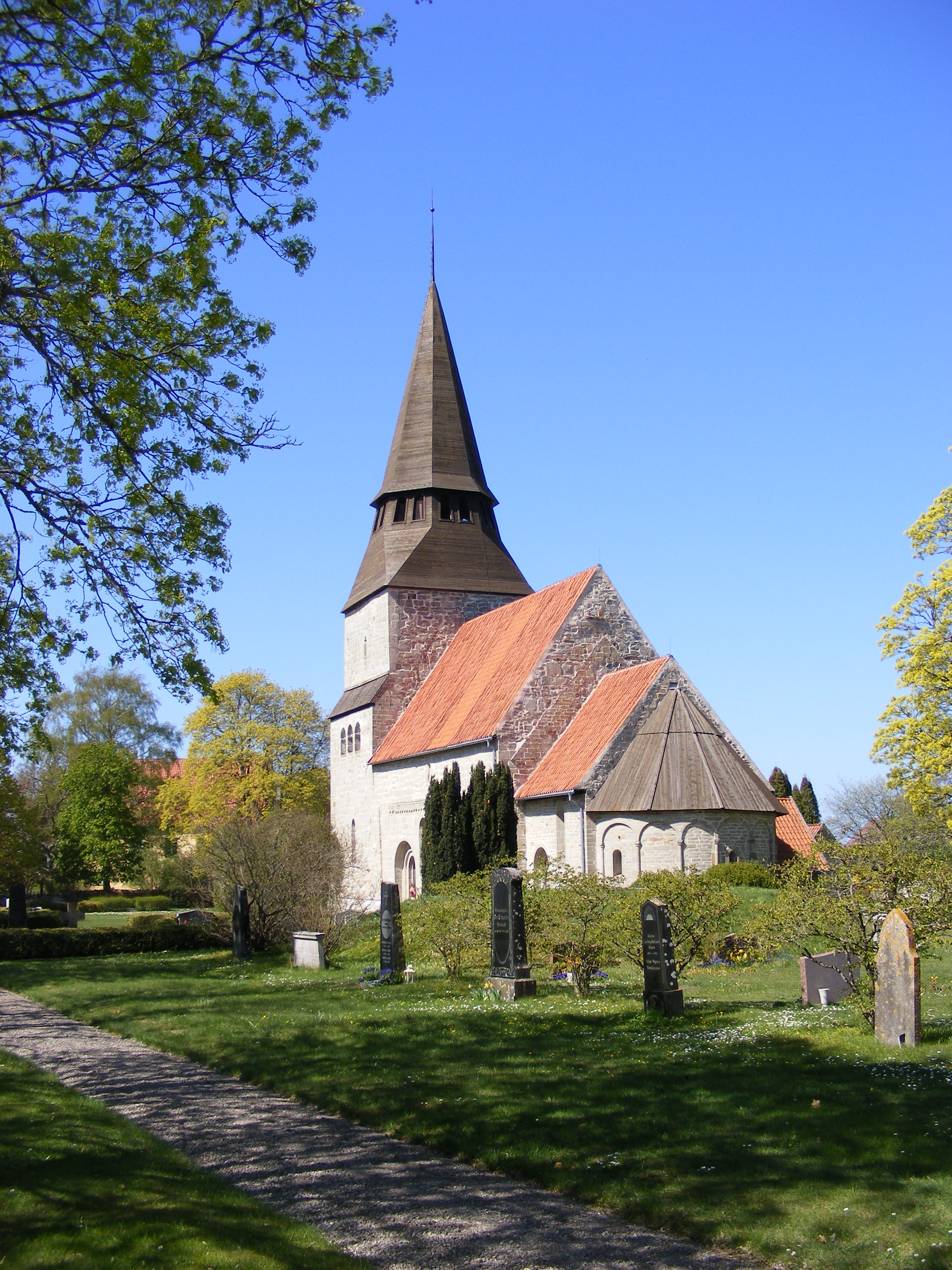
- Havdhem Church

- Location within Gotland
- Coordinates: 57°09′N 18°19′E
- Country: Sweden
- Province: Gotland
- County: Gotland County
- Municipality: Gotland Municipality

Area
  - Total: 0.90 km^{2} (0.35 sq mi)

Population (31 December 2014)
  - Total: 300
- Time zone: UTC+1 (CET)
  - Summer (DST): UTC+2 (CEST)

Havdhem (Swedish pronunciation: [ˈhâvdhɛm]) is a locality situated on the Swedish island of Gotland with 300 inhabitants in 2014.

Havdhem is also the name of the larger populated area, socken (not to be confused with parish). It comprises the same area as the administrative Havdhem District, established on 1 January 2016.

== Geography ==
Havdhem is the name of the locality surrounding the medieval Havdhem Church, sometimes referred to as Havdhem kyrkby. It is also the name of the socken as well as the district. Havdhem is situated in the central south part of Gotland.

As of 2019, Havdhem Church belongs to Havdhem parish in Sudrets pastorat, along with the churches in Näs, Grötlingbo, Eke, Hablingbo and Silte.

== History ==
In 1961, Havdhem Municipality initiated a relief work project at Havor hillfort in Hablingbo that lead to the discovery of the Havor Hoard.

== Events ==
The annual Havdhem Market is one of the major autumn markets on Gotland. There are five official markets held on the island in August–October: Slite, Havdhem, Kräklingbo, Klintehamn and Hemse, each usually spanning a weekend.
