= Bro Church, Gotland =

Bro Church
- Bro kyrka
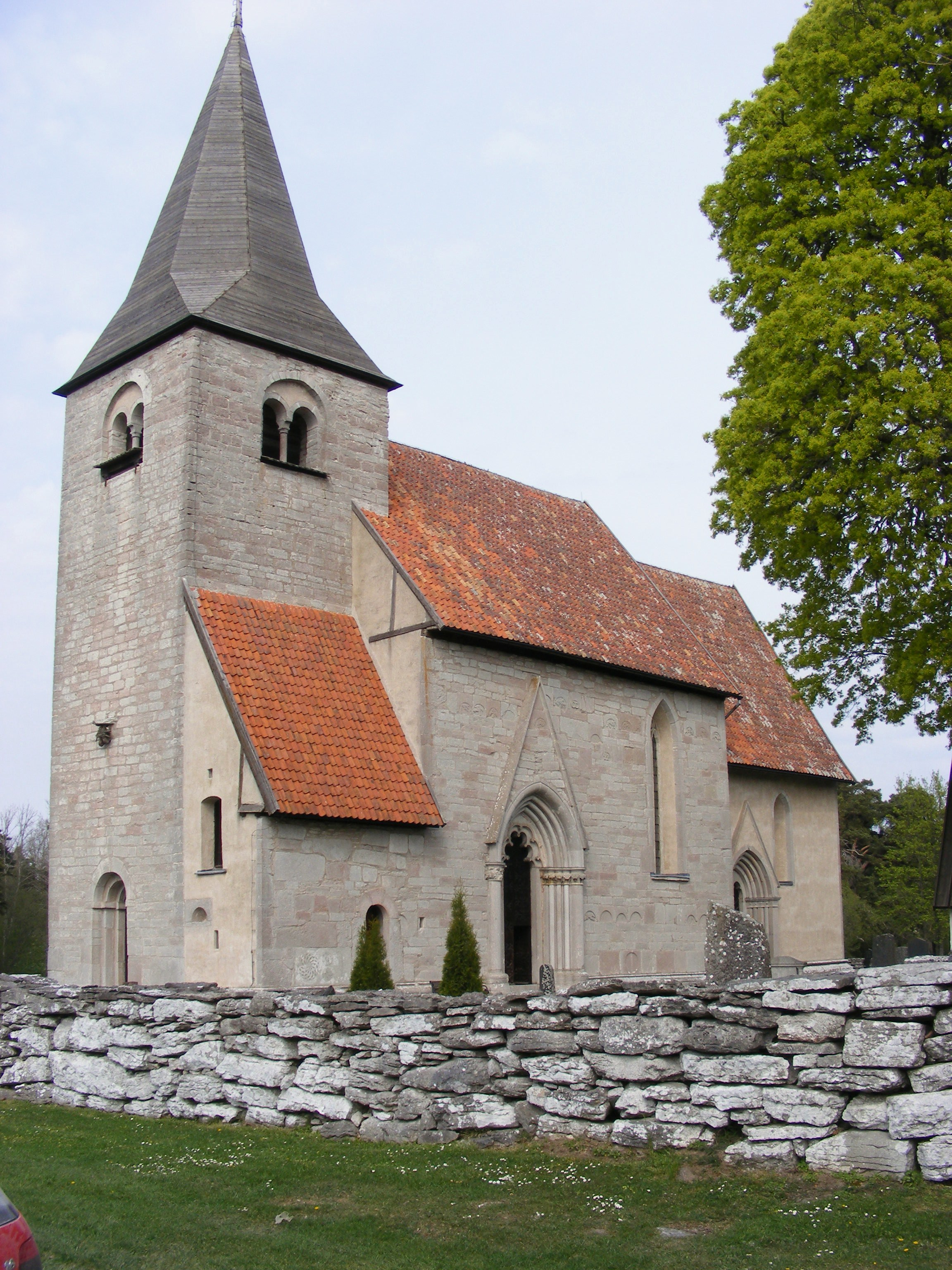
- Bro Church, external view

- Location on Gotland
- 57°40′12″N 18°28′30″E
- Country: Sweden
- Denomination: Church of Sweden

Administration
- Diocese: Visby

Bro Church (Swedish: Bro kyrka) is a medieval-era Lutheran church at Bro on the Swedish island of Gotland. Situated on what may have been a pre-Christian sacred site, the present church was built in the 13th century. Stylistically, its architecture shows a mix of Romanesque and Gothic elements. It still contains some medieval furnishings, including a baptismal font by Sigraf, and murals. The church belongs to the Väskinde parish in the Diocese of Visby of the Church of Sweden.

== History ==
The present-day church is possibly located on an ancient pre-Christian sacred site. There is a well nearby the church which tradition claims to have been a sacrificial well. More concretely, the area is rich in ancient remains, notably a number of picture stones dating from the 5th century.

A first Christian church was probably built in the form of a stave church during the 12th century, of which nothing however remains. Building of the presently visible limestone church probably began in the early 13th century. The present tower, dating from the 1240s, is a remains of this first, Romanesque building. During the middle of the 13th century, a new Gothic apse replaced the previous Romanesque, and likewise a new nave was erected at the end of the century. During this time the profusely rich medieval interior decoration of the church was also successively added.

No further greater changes has been made to the exterior of the church since; however, the interior of the church has been affected by additional adornment and also attempts at re-painting the older murals in 1686, ruining the medieval paintings to some extent. Several of the interior details, such as the pulpit and altarpiece, were also added during the Baroque era. Even so, the church remains one of the most well-preserved medieval churches on Gotland.

Bro Church today belongs to Väskinde parish in the Diocese of Visby of the Church of Sweden.

== Architecture ==
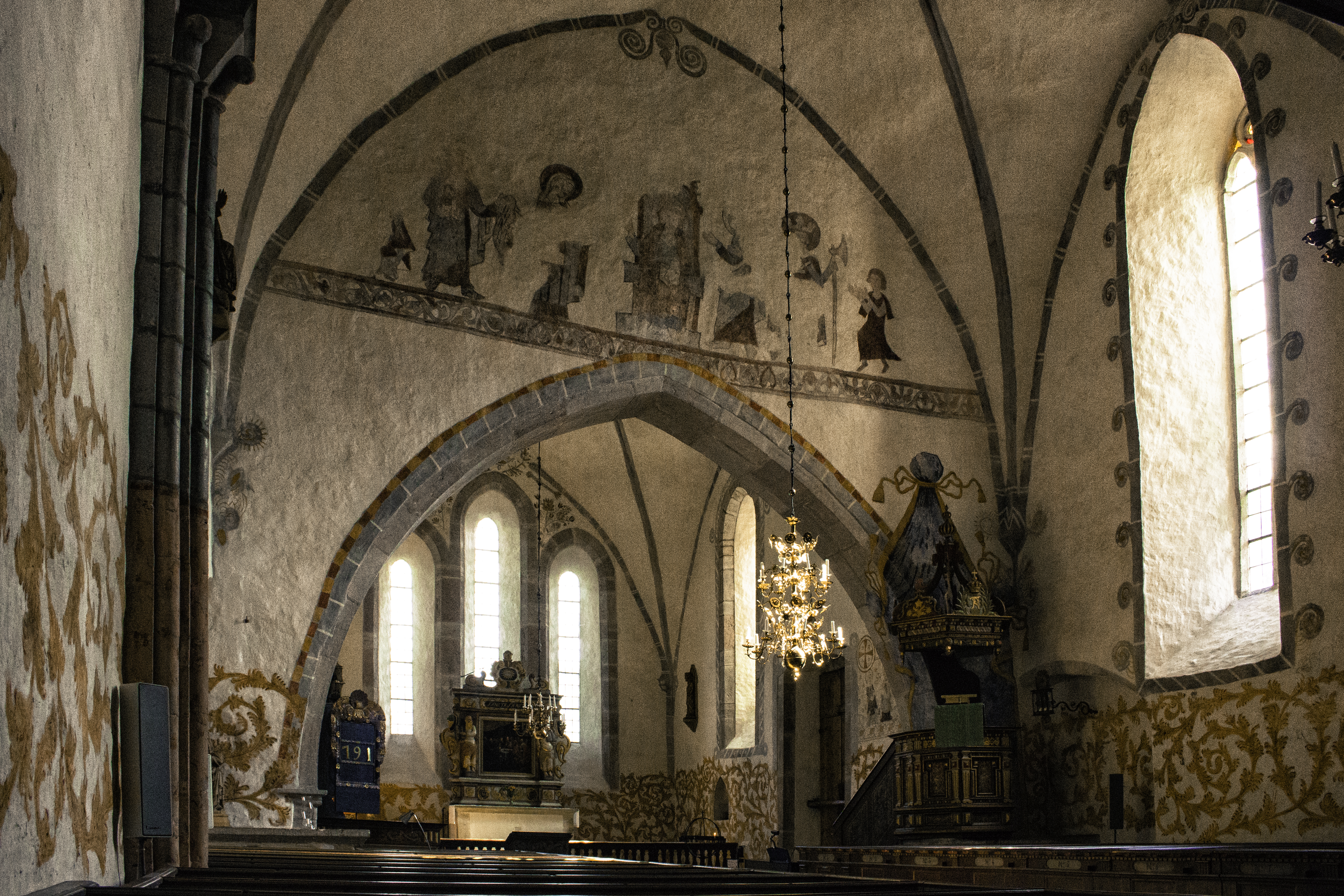
Interior, view towards the choir

Bro church displays a mix of Romanesque and Gothic architecture and art, with several Baroque details. The tower is a sturdy late Romanesque edifice. The nave is a high, Gothic room with broad vaults which do not rest on any supporting pillars but reach to the walls. The apse is straight, typically for churches on Gotland, instead of semi-circular.

Several Romanesque friezes, dating from the earlier church, has been incorporated haphazardly in the Gothic church in the exterior wall. A few considerably older picture stones have also been immured in the church. The church has a richly carved southern portal, with capitals depicting, on one side the childhood of Christ, the Resurrection and Hell, while the other side displays intricately carved foliage.

Wall paintings cover much of the interior of the church. The original, medieval paintings display scenes from the Passion of Christ, and Christ in Majesty. These paintings have on several places been painted over during the 17th century with acanthus-motives and other decoration. Bro church still has its original Romanesque baptismal font, a work by the stone sculptor or workshop known as Sigraf (c.1175–1210). Of the former medieval wooden sculptures, only the triumphal cross dating from the middle of the 12th century remains.
