= Eke Church =

- Eke kyrka
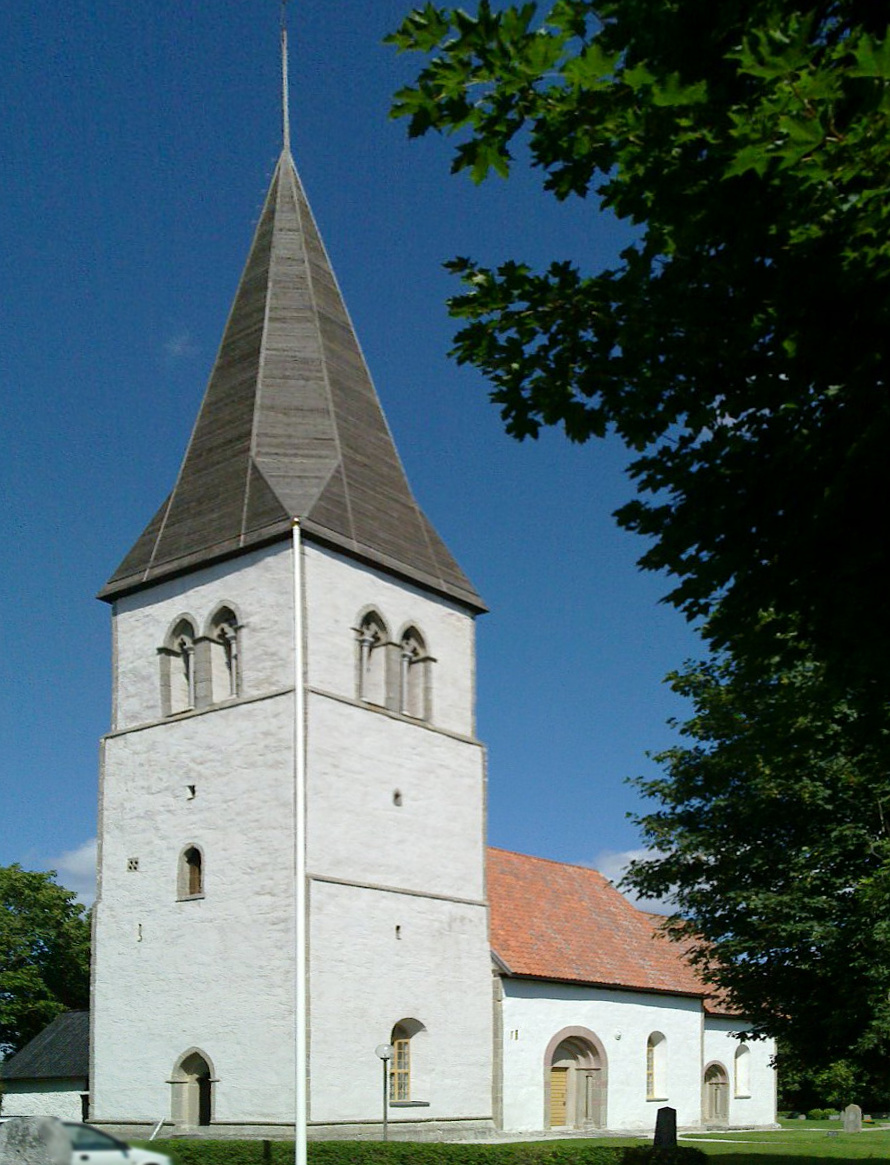
- Eke Church, view of the exterior

- Location on Gotland
- 57°10′05″N 18°22′45″E
- Country: Sweden
- Denomination: Church of Sweden

Administration
- Diocese: Visby

Eke Church (Swedish: Eke kyrka) is a medieval church in Eke on the Swedish island of Gotland. The church was built during the 12th and 13th centuries, with only smaller additions and changes made later. Inside, several medieval murals survive. The church is used by the Church of Sweden and lies in the Diocese of Visby.

== History and architecture ==
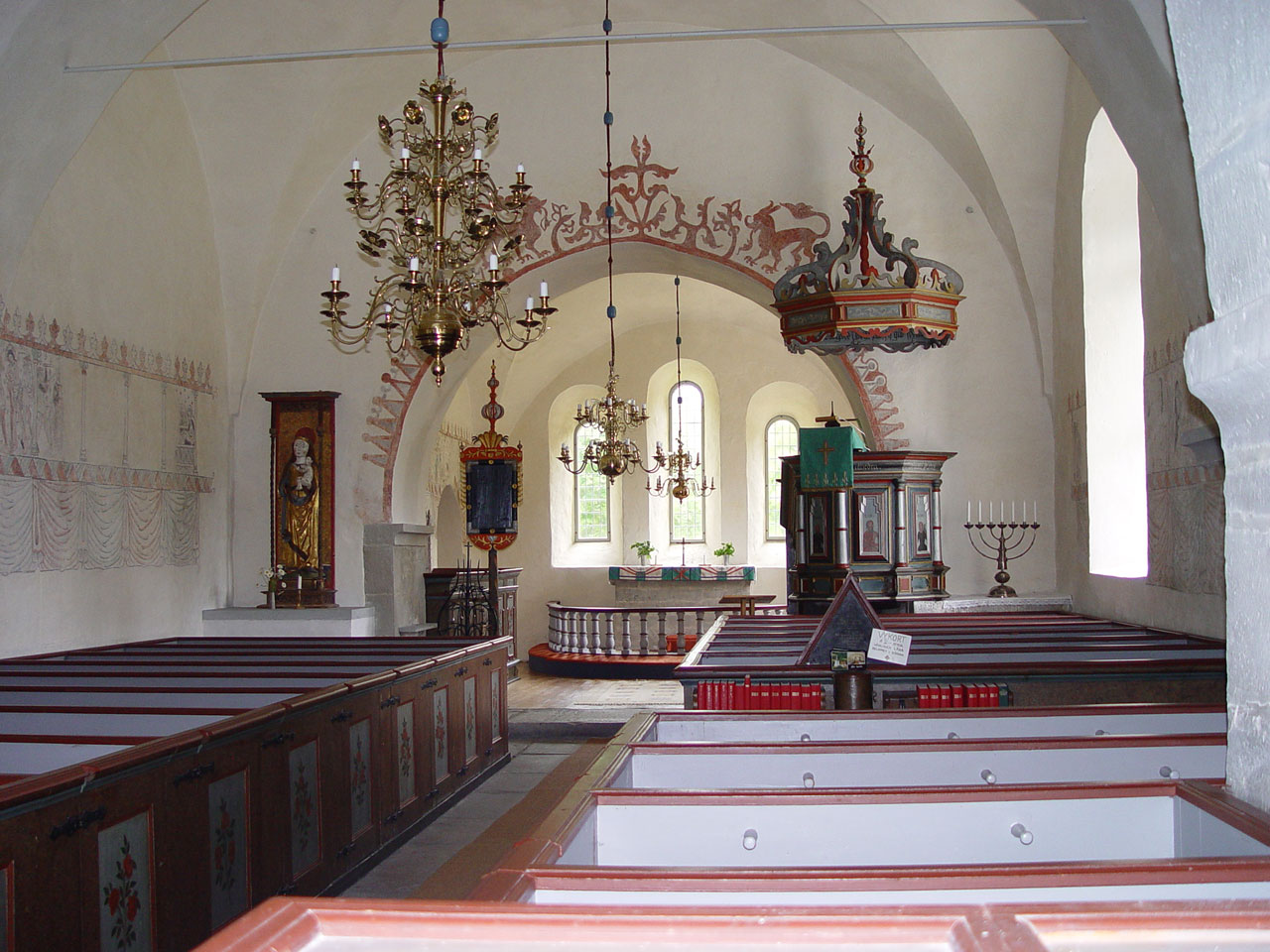
View of the interior towards the choir

The current church with its Romanesque nave and Gothic tower was predated by a stave church on the same location, fragments of which was found under the floor of the presently visible church in 1916. The stave church had been decorated with paintings in Byzantine style.

The oldest part of the current building is the nave and choir, dating from the mid-13th century. The disproportionately massive tower was added circa 1300. Later additions to the church include the vestry (19th century), and the enlargement of all original windows save one.

Externally, the church is dominated by the massive tower. The tower has a Gothic portal while the nave has Romanesque portals, decorated with alternating red limestone and grey-green sandstone.

Internally, the church is richly decorated with medieval murals. The oldest (13th century) are found in the choir and depict imaginary animals, geometrical ornaments and foliage. The other paintings are from the middle of the 15th century and depict scenes from the Passion of Christ as well as other stories from the bible.

Among the church furnishings, the baptismal font by the Romanesque sculptor Sigraf, dating from the 12th century, deserves mention, as does a wooden Madonna from about 1500. The pews and the pulpit are from the 18th century.

The church was renovated in 1916 and again in 1969-1971.
