= Sigraf =

Romanesque stone sculptor

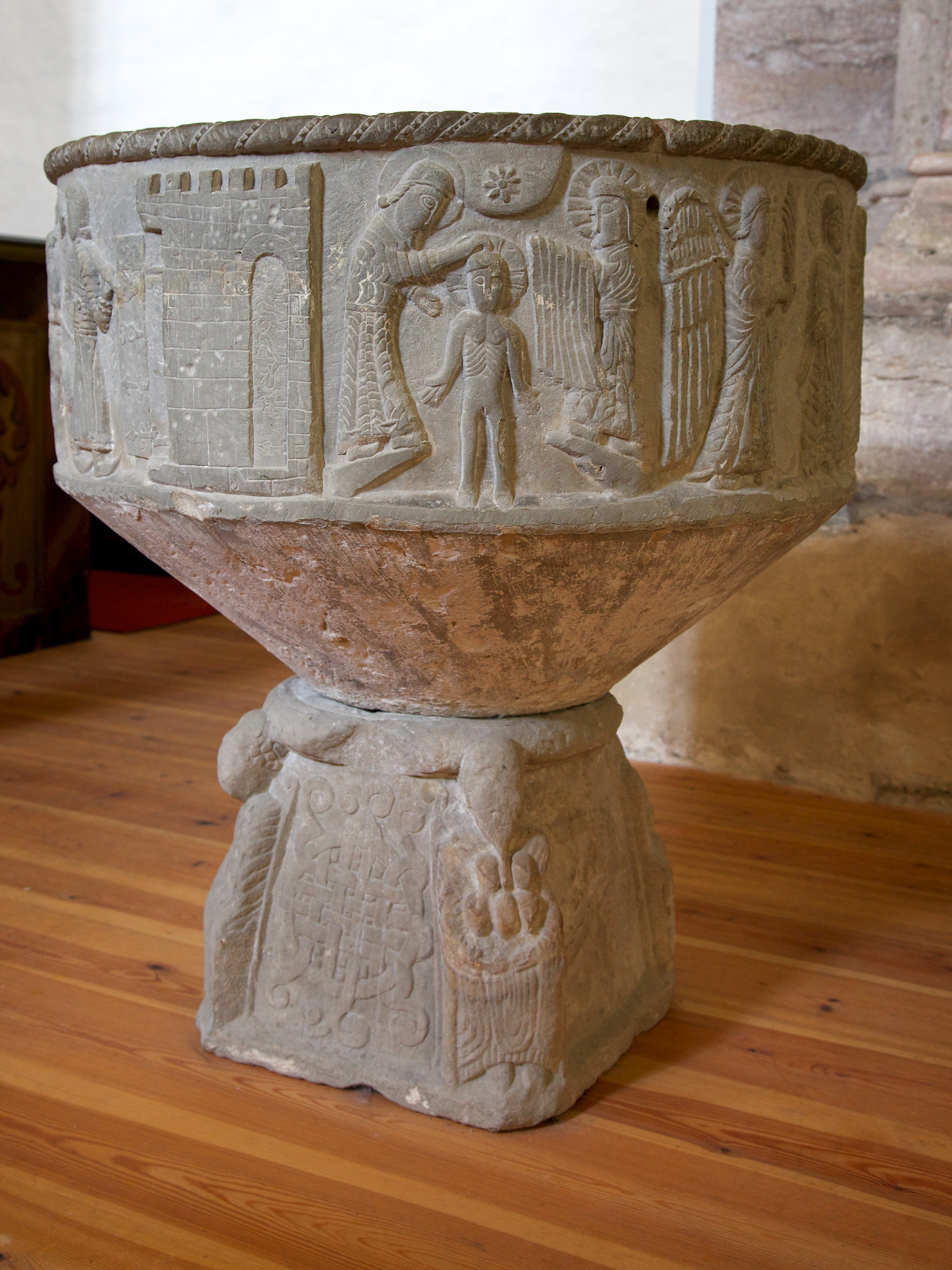
Baptismal font attributed to Master Sigraf in Grötlingbo church, Gotland (Sweden).

Sigraf (also Sighraf, Sighrafr, fl. c.1175–1210) was a Romanesque stone sculptor, working on Gotland. He was mainly active as a sculptor of baptismal fonts, but also of reliquaries, carved pillars and reliefs. He was the most productive of several early medieval stone sculptors making baptismal fonts on Gotland.

== Works ==
Unusually, this early medieval master stone sculptor is known by name since he has signed one of the fonts attributed to him (in Aa Church, on Bornholm island in Denmark) with runes, Sighraf Master. He was active on Gotland island, working in local sandstone and making inscriptions in Old Gutnish. The works of his atelier were exported to several places around the Baltic Sea, and he seems to have been the first sculptor of Romanesque fonts on Gotland to focus mainly on export, possibly because his home market was beginning to become satisfied. He was trained locally and his oeuvre displays similarities with earlier stone sculptors from Gotland, e.g. Semi-Byzantios and Majestatis. His style is classical Romanesque with Norse influences.

Sigraf has been identified as the creator of 23 baptismal fonts, including those in Silte, Bro, Eke, Grötlingbo, Lau churches, all on Gotland, as well as Hannas and Hammenhög churches, Scania; Brunflo church, Jämtland; Mo church, Hälsingland; Skogs-Tibble and Knivsta churches, Uppland; Locknevi church, Småland; Tingstad church, Östergötland; Mölln, Schleswig-Holstein; St. Bendt's Church, Ringsted and possibly others.

== See also ==
- Byzantios
- Calcarius
- Hegvald
- Majestatis
