= Grötlingbo Church =

- Grötlingbo kyrka
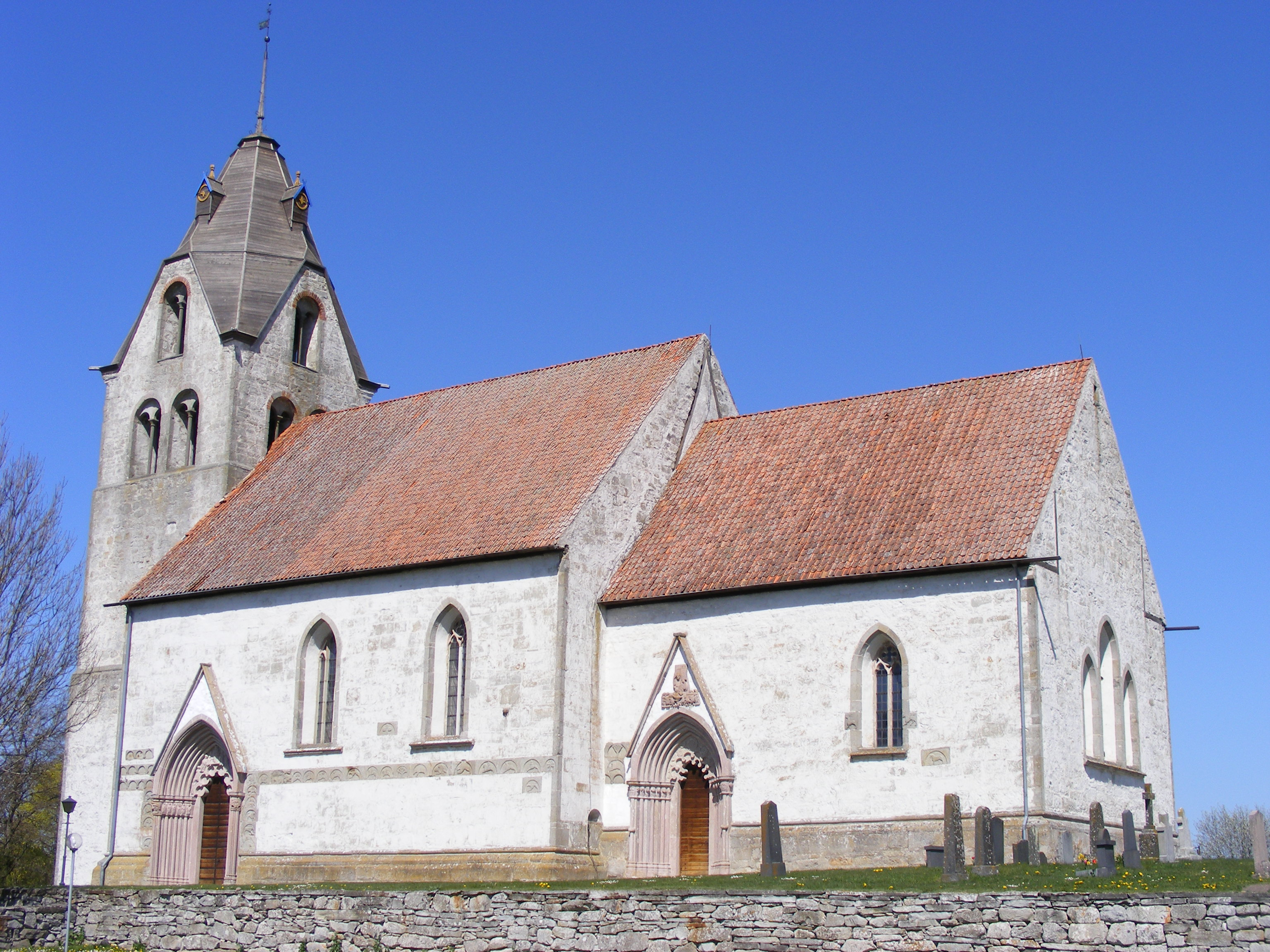
- Grötlingbo Church, view of the exterior

- Location on Gotland
- 57°08′01″N 18°20′48″E
- Country: Sweden
- Denomination: Church of Sweden

Administration
- Diocese: Visby

Grötlingbo Church (Swedish: Grötlingbo kyrka) is a medieval church in Grötlingbo on the Swedish island Gotland. The stately Gothic church contains elements of a Romanesque frieze, incorporated from an earlier church building on the same site. Görtlingbo Church lies within the Diocese of Visby.

== History ==
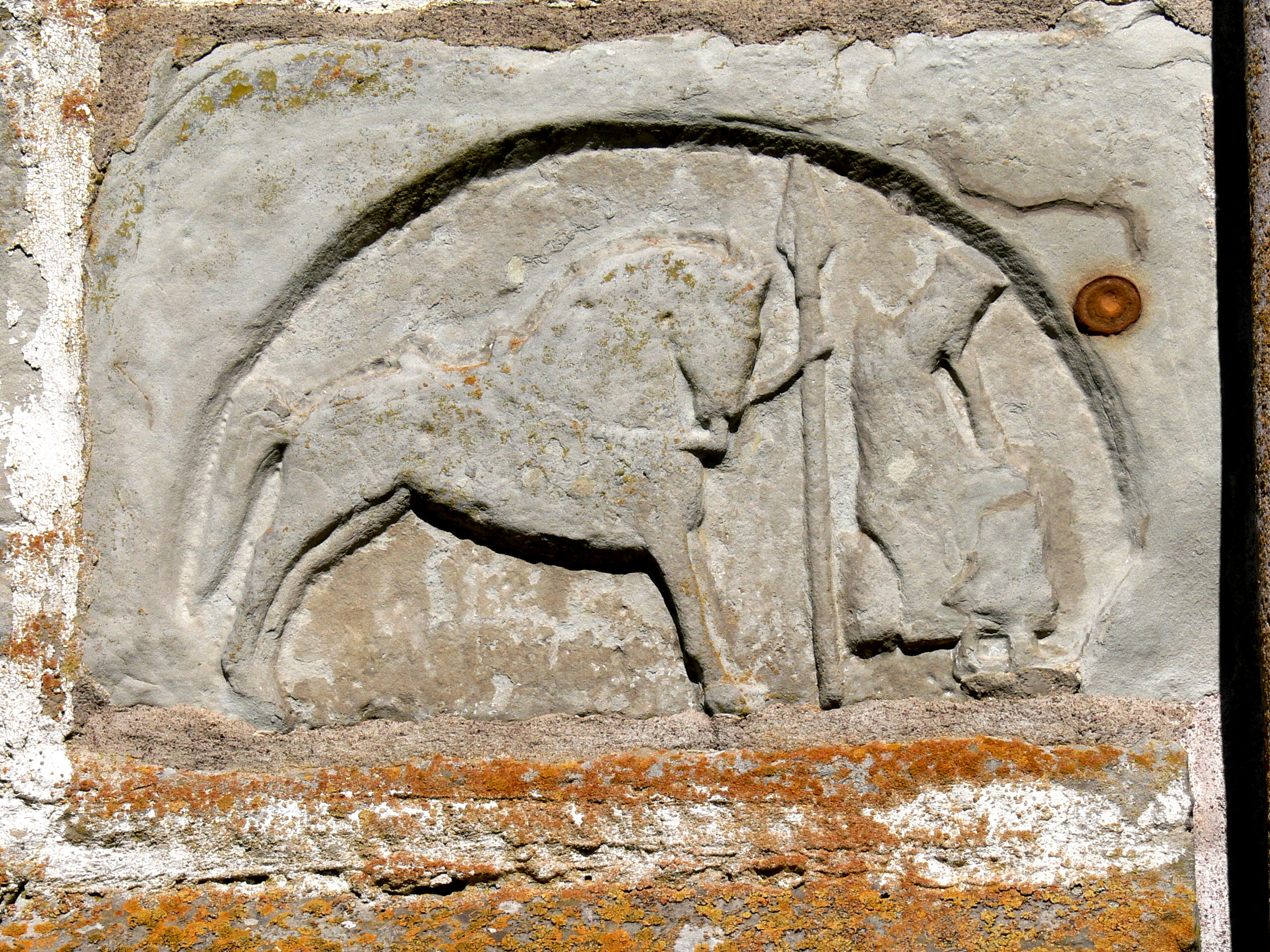
Part of the Romanesque frieze made by Sigraf

The earliest written record of the church is from 1296 (730 years ago), when it is mentioned in a papal bull. Archaeological excavations carried out in 1956–1957 however show that there was a stone church here already in the 12th century. The finely carved reliefs that adorn the southern façade of the present church obviously come from this first, Romanesque church and have been incorporated in the later Gothic church that is visible today. The western tower was added in the 13th century, and a major reconstruction of the church into its present form was carried out during the late 14th century. The church has remained largely unaltered since, except for a few new furnishings.

Asger Jorn is buried in the church cemetery.

== Architecture ==
The church is large in comparison with other country churches on Gotland, and built of local sandstone. The nave is divided in three sections by sturdy columns. The choir lacks an apse and instead ends with three slender Gothic windows, a design typical for medieval churches on Gotland. The tower is Romanesque but the spire dates from the 18th century.

The southern façade is adorned with elements of a Romanesque frieze, made by the artist commonly referred to as Sigraf and dating from circa 1200. They depict animals, both real and mystical, as well as fighting men and knights on horseback. Scholars are divided as to what they may depict. Some speculate that they may be an illustration of evil forces, pursuing humans. Others argue that they may be illustrating an ancient tale, perhaps that of Beowulf.

Later and Gothic in style are the two carved portals on south side of the church. They date from the middle of the 14th century and the workshop has been identified as the notname Egypticus, which was active on Gotland during c. 1330–1380. They depicts Christian scenes such as the Virgin Mary and the Resurrection. Typically for Egypticus the sculpted portals also include grinning, grotesque faces.

Inside the church a few 14th century murals survive in the choir, depicting Christian scenes of the same type as the sculpted portals. The vaults in the nave also have some purely decorative paintings. Between the nave and the choir hangs a large triumphal cross, dating from the middle of the 13th century. The baptismal font is also a work by Sigraf and referred to as one of the finest examples of the sculptor's art. The pulpit dates from the Renaissance and was originally made for Visby Cathedral. It still displays the Danish coat of arms, rather than the Swedish.
