= Gotland Museum =

Coordinates: 57°38′22.93″N 18°17′32.84″E

- Gotlands museum
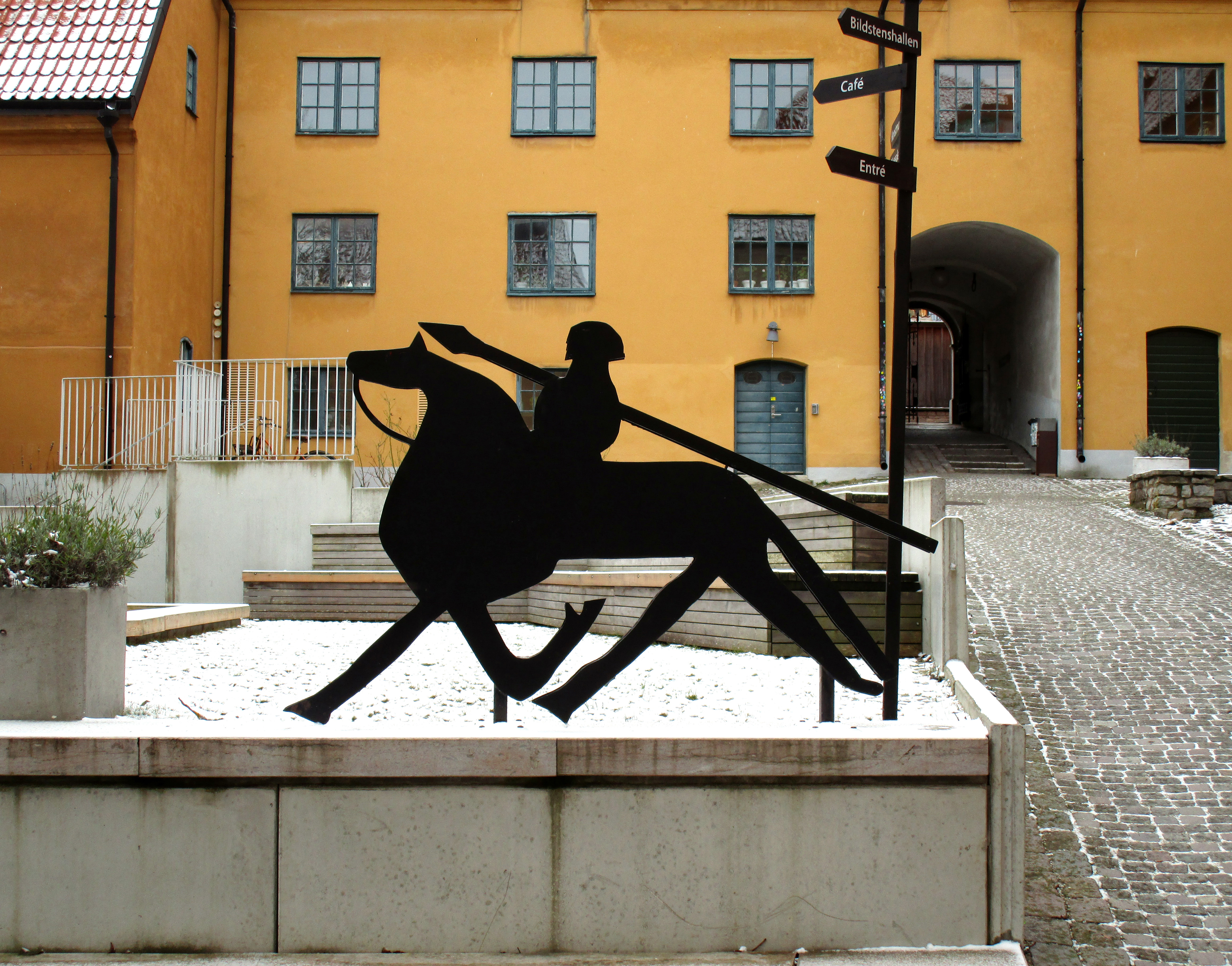
- The Gotland Museum logo

- Location of the Gotland Museum
- Former name: Länsmuseet på Gotland or Gotlands Fornsal
- Established: 1875
- Location: Visby, Sweden
- Type: Archaeology museum, Local museum, Art museum
- Key holdings: The Picture stone Hall; Spillings Hoard
- Collections: Bronze Age, Viking Age, Middle Ages
- Collection size: 400,000
- Visitors: 200,000
- Founder: Pehr Arvid Säve
- Director: Susanne Thedéen (2017–)
- Owner: Gotlands Fornvänner
- Public transit access: Visby harbor
- Parking: Visby harbor
- Website: gotlandsmuseum.se

The Gotland Museum (Swedish: Gotlands museum) (previously known as Länsmuseet på Gotland or Gotlands Fornsal) in Visby, Sweden, is the county museum of Gotland. It was founded by the Friends of Gotland's Antiquity society in 1875, at the initiative of Pehr Arvid Säve. The museum owns a number of houses and farms on Gotland, some of which are used as museums. It also has a publishing house for books on subjects related to the island's heritage.

== Collections ==
The museum's collections consists of about 400,000 objects, which are stored in three depositories. The largest of these is the Magasin Visborg outside Visby and since 2014, this storehouse is open to the public.

The collections are divided into these sections:

- Collection of cultural history — Clothes, textiles, household items, weapons, agricultural object.
- Art collection — Paintings, graphic prints, sculptures.
- Archeological collection — Objects representing Gotland's history from 7,000-year-old stone axes to Medieval seals. Finds from excavations on the island.
- Collection of natural history — Fossils, herbariums, butterflies, mounted animals, skeletons.

The objects in the collections have in most cases been donated to the museum by individuals, single items or entire estates. While some of the art has been bought by the museum, the art collection also comprises art from the Brucebo Foundation, the Heritage Society and the Gotland Municipality, held in trust by the museum.

The most prominent permanent exhibitions in the museum are the Picture Stone Hall, Spillings Hoard and 1361 - Battle for Gotland, about the Danish invasion of Gotland in 1361, led by Valdemar Atterdag resulting in the Battle of Mästerby and the Battle of Visby.

== History ==
The museum was founded in 1875, by the Friends of Gotland's Antiquity society (Gotlands fornvänner) at the initiative of Pehr Arvid Säve. The purpose was to collect historic artifacts and everyday objects connected to Gotland as well as documenting immaterial aspects of life on the island.

Through the years, the function of the museum has remained the same. The museum has grown steadily as the collections increased. Houses, farms and other buildings have been left to the museum in wills and through donations, and the number of members in the society have increased from a handful to over 2,400 in 2015.

In 2011, the museum initiated a networking project with other museums in countries around the Baltic Sea.

=== Gotlands Fornvänner ===
The Friends of Gotland's Antiquity society was founded on 16 October 1874. The initiator was P A Säve and the purpose of the society was to collect all kind of objects that had been used in everyday life in the past on Gotland and preserve them for future generations. Folktales, songs, traditions, craft skills and other aspects of life on the island, past and present, were to be written down in books, journals and notes, and collected in an archive.

The following year, on 22 May at five o'clock in the afternoon the society had a meeting where it was decided to rent some kind of premises for the collections. A "Hall of Antiquities" (a Fornsal) was to be created and opened to the public. The society first rented a hall in the old school for girls close to the Visby Cathedral, and in the beginning of July 1880, the old brännvin distillery at Strandgatan was bought by the society to serve as the first museum. The first house is now known as the Picture stone Hall (Bildstenshallen).

As of 2015, the Friends of Gotland's Antiquity owns the entire block surrounding the Picture stone Hall which is the modern museum. The society owns several farms and houses that are also part of the museum. Membership in the society is open to anyone for a fee.

== Buildings ==
The museum consists of the main building Fornsalen at Standgatan in Visby, Gotlands Konstmuseum (the Art Museum), Kapitelhusgården (Chapter House Manor), Kajsartornet fängelsemuseum (Kajsar Tower Prison Museum), Kattlunds, Petes and Norrbys.

=== Fornsalen ===
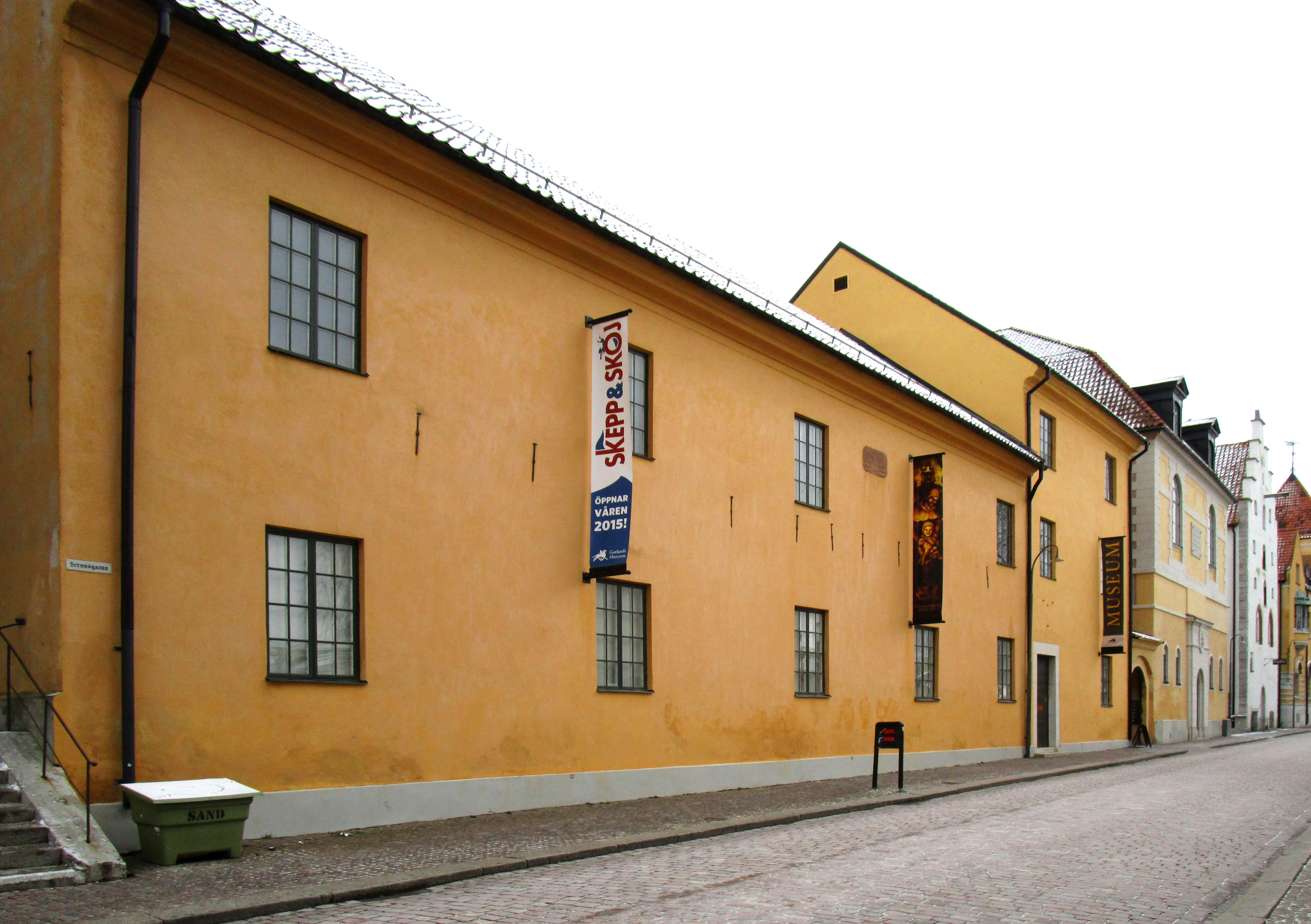
Gotlands Museum, main building

The main building of the museum is as of 2015, the entire block of buildings surrounded by Strandgatan, Mellangatan, Brännerigränd and Dubbens gränd. The buildings are placed around a central court yard, from which the different parts of the museum are accessed. The block is divided into two sections, the Museet 1 and Museet 2. These sections are made up of six houses, some of which are made from two or more older houses, where walls or parts of the buildings have been reused or incorporated into the newer ones.

In the Middle Ages, the block was in the part of the town which was the center of commerce and trade. At that time the square-shaped block had numerous smaller buildings divided into three block by two narrow alleys running in an east-westerly direction. A number of the foundations for these old houses are still intact under ground. This structure was used until 1697, when the southern alley disappeared and the building plots were redistributed. In 1777, the Swedish government bought the whole block to use as one of its brännvin distilleries (Kronobränneri). At that time the block consisted of 18 buildings of varying size. These were partly demolished, rebuilt, added to or converted, giving the block its present layout. The system with these types of distilleries did not last long and in 1813, part of the block was sold to a merchant and starting from 1830, the rest of the houses were used as storage for weapons and ammunition by the Swedish army.

After having bought the first house, Fornsalen, for their exhibition in 1880, the Gotlands fornvänner society continued to buy and add buildings within the block and extend the museum. In 1930, they had bought and incorporated the entire block into the Gotland Museum. The buildings are now linked with each other to accommodate the exhibitions and administration of the museum. During the 20th century, additional stairwells and elevators have been installed. The court yard was renovated and the main entrance to the museum was moved from Standgatan to the yard during the conversion in 2007.

=== Gotlands Konstmuseum ===
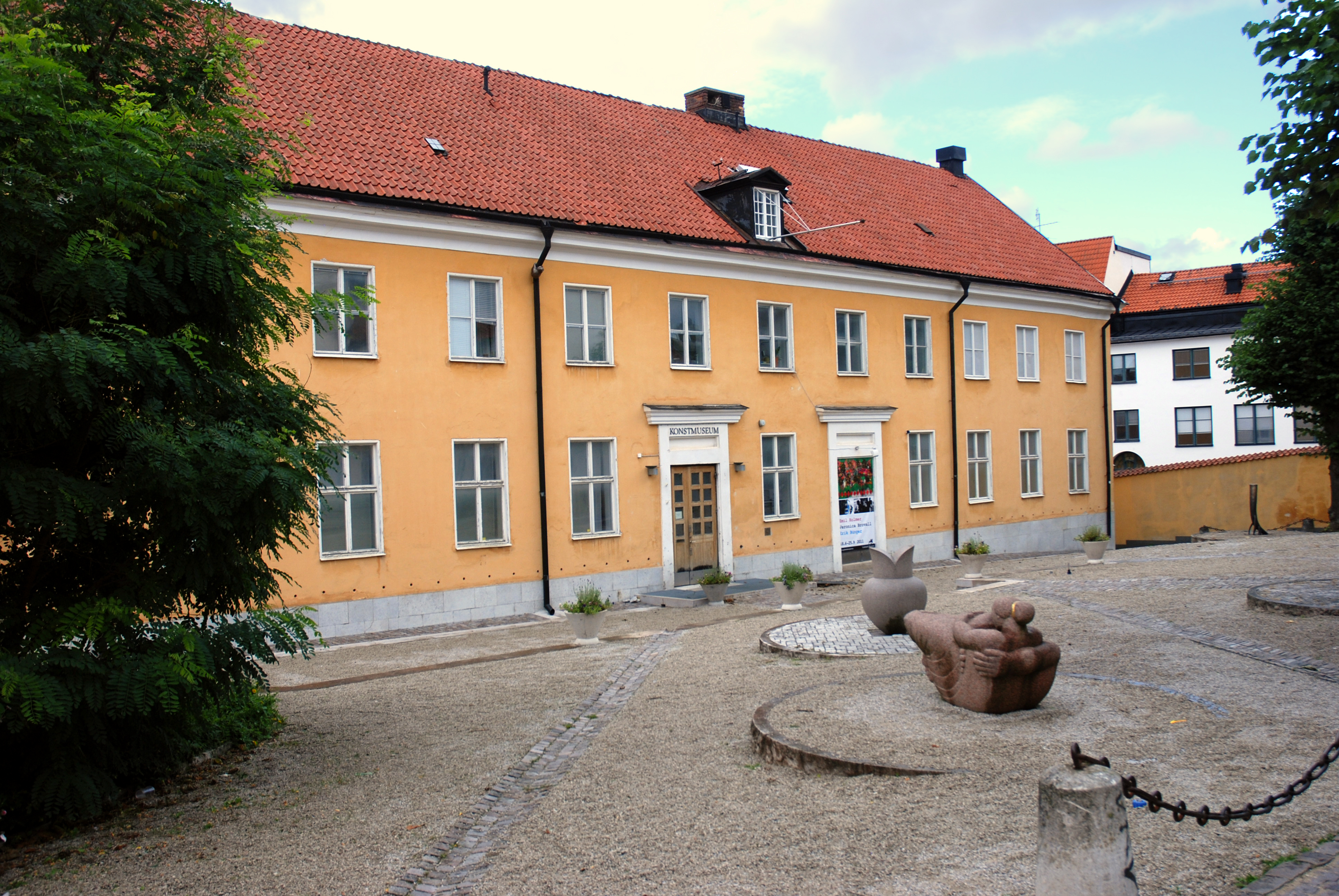
The Art Museum

The building at Sankt Hansgatan 21, was built in 1847–58 by architect C Bergman to house the first volksschule in Visby. It later became school for first and second graders in Visby, and from the 1950s it was used by the Visby läroverk, a school for the town's teenage students. With the completion of a new large school outside the wall in 1971, the building was used for various other forms of education. The house was completely renovated in 1987–88, to accommodate the newly established art museum.

As of 2015, the art museum is part of the Gotland Museum. The museum collection consists mainly of paintings and arts and craft with a connection to Gotland, starting from the early 19th century up to the present time.

=== Kapitelhusgården ===
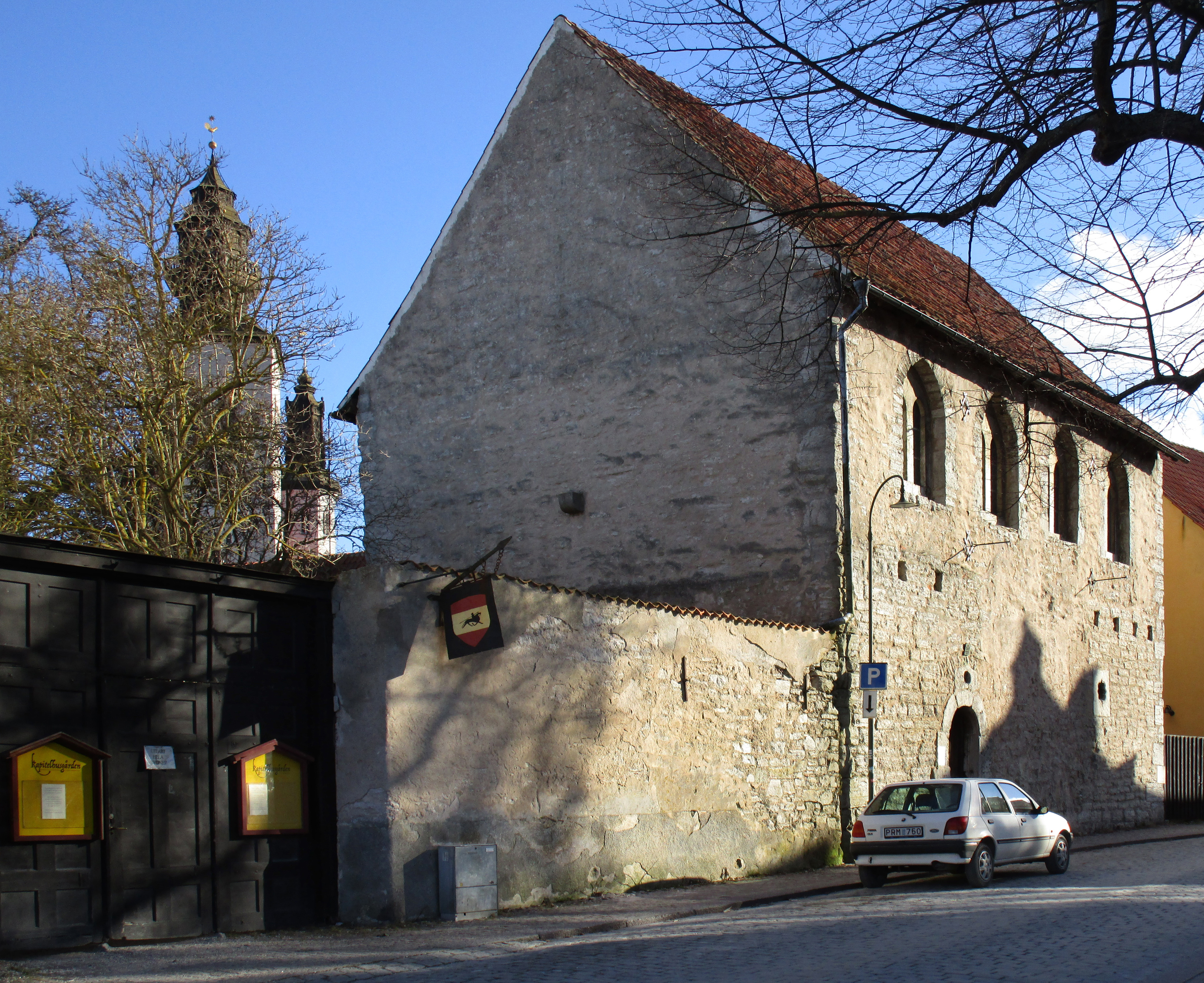
Kapitelhusgården

The Kapitelhusgården (the Chapter House Manor) was the residence of the bishop of Linköping on his visits to Visby during the Middle Ages, and is mentioned as such for the first time in 1432. The ground floor of the main house or Chapter House (Kapitelhuset), was built during the first half of the 13th century, with the grand hall on the second floor added about half a century later. The building has no cellar. The house functioned as the town's firewood depot, well into the 19th century and was hence nicknamed "the bishop's woodshed". As of 2015 the house is owned by the Gotlands Fornvänner.

Adjacent to the house is a courtyard surrounded by smaller buildings and sheds. During the summer, this is turned into a herb garden, a medieval tavern and workshops for medieval handicraft. The museum also have an exhibition in the main house.

=== Kajsartornet ===
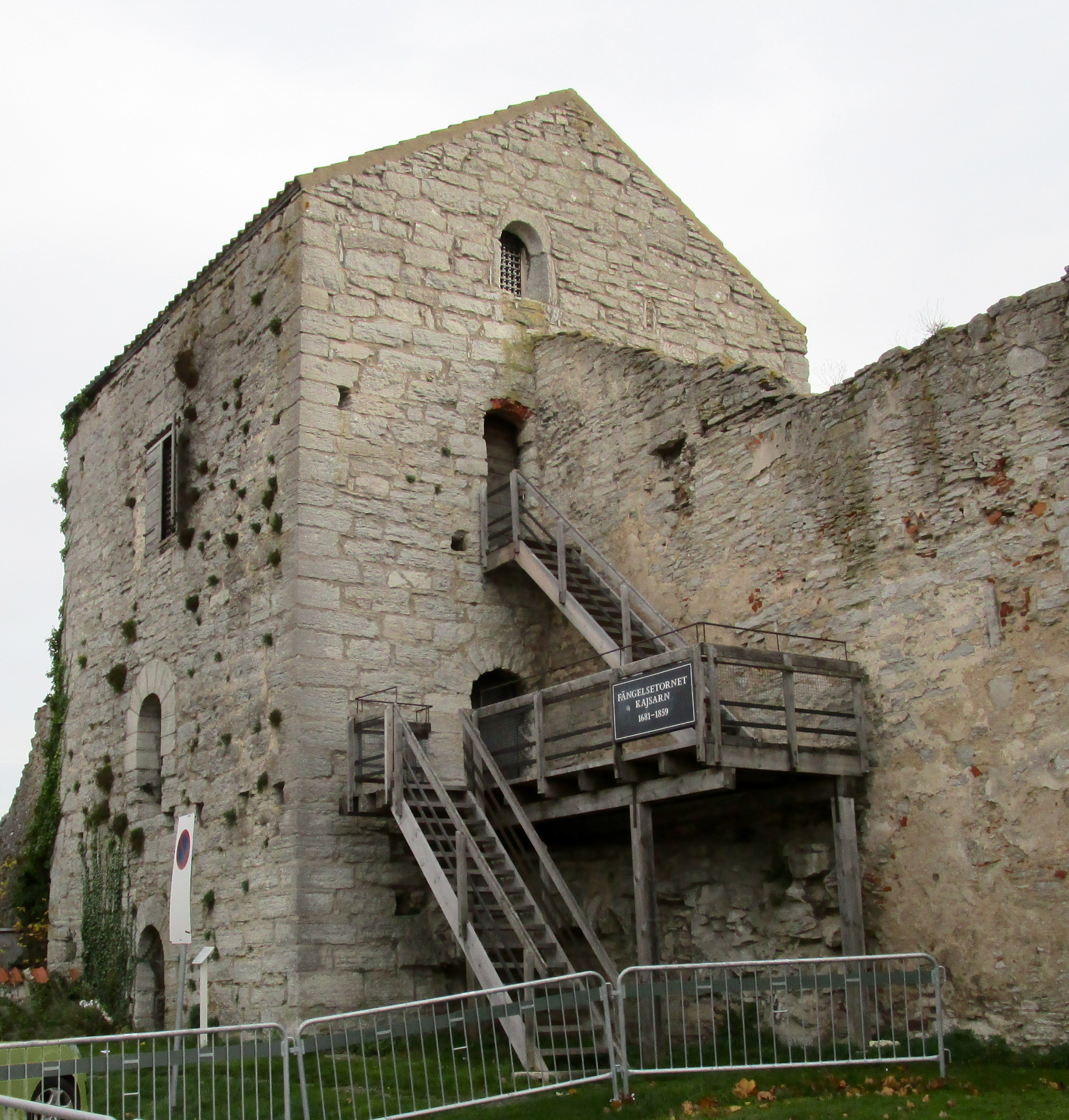
The Kajsar Tower

The Kajsartornet or Kajsarn (the Kajsar Tower) is a part of, and was built at the same time as, the Visby City Wall, making it the oldest tower in the east part of the wall. The tower was used as the town's prison from 1681 to 1859. As of 2015, it is used as a prison museum under the direction of the Gotland Museum.

=== Kattlunds ===
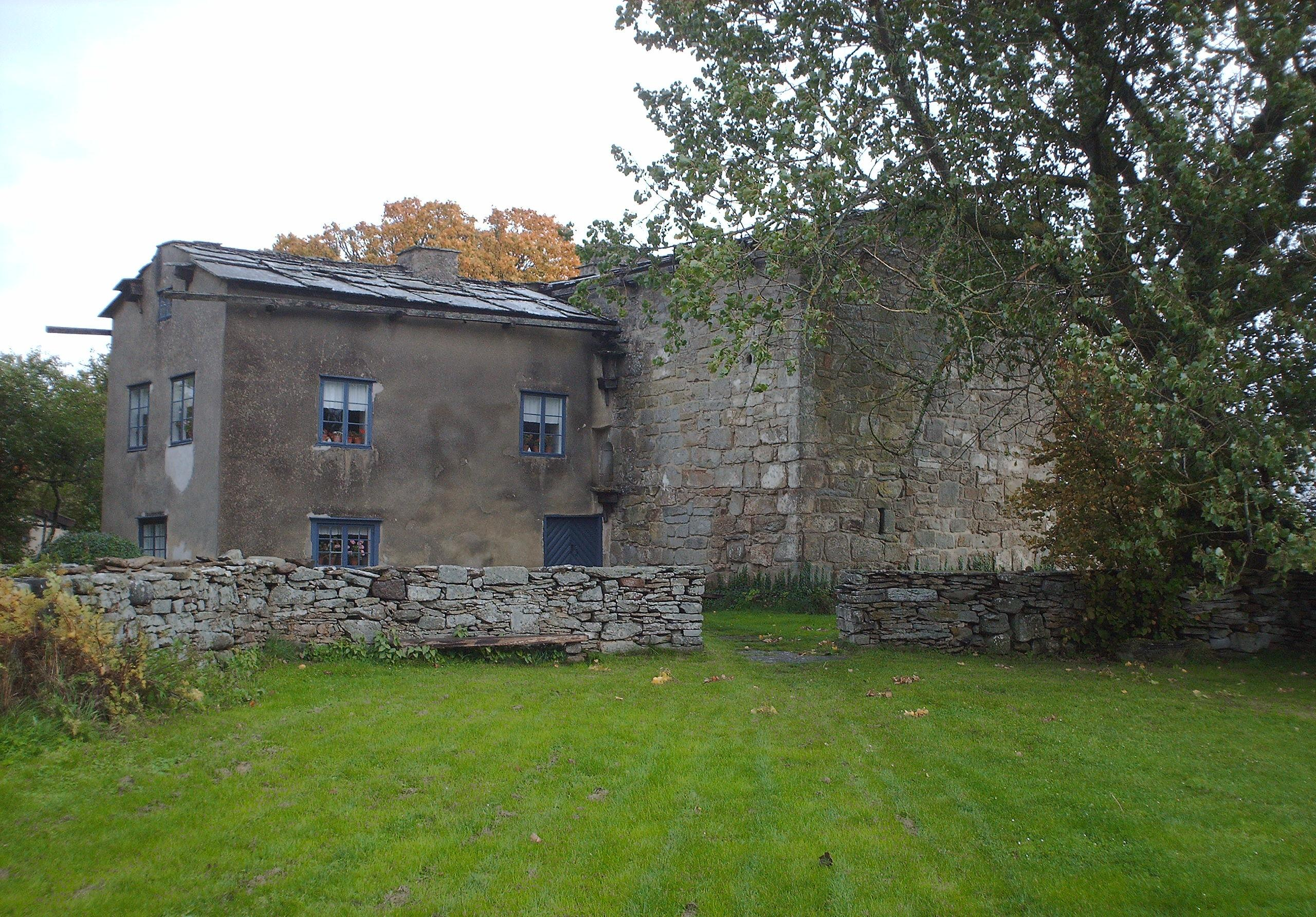
Kattlunds farm

The main building on the Kattlunds farm in Grötlingbo is partially medieval. The oldest part of the house is from the 13th century. The first house was expanded upon during the late 1700s and early 1800s, and it has been preserved in that state. The farm is named after the first known owner, Botulf Kattlund a judge from Eke thing. In 1922, the farm was bought by Gotlands Fornvänner. The acquisition was made possible by a donation from Wilhelmina von Hallwyl. Adjacent to the farm is a 12th-century citadel. It was still three stories high in the 18th century. An archeological examination was conducted in 1950. As of 2015, the farm is an open-air museum during the summers, hosting markets, jousting tournaments and private events.

=== Petes ===
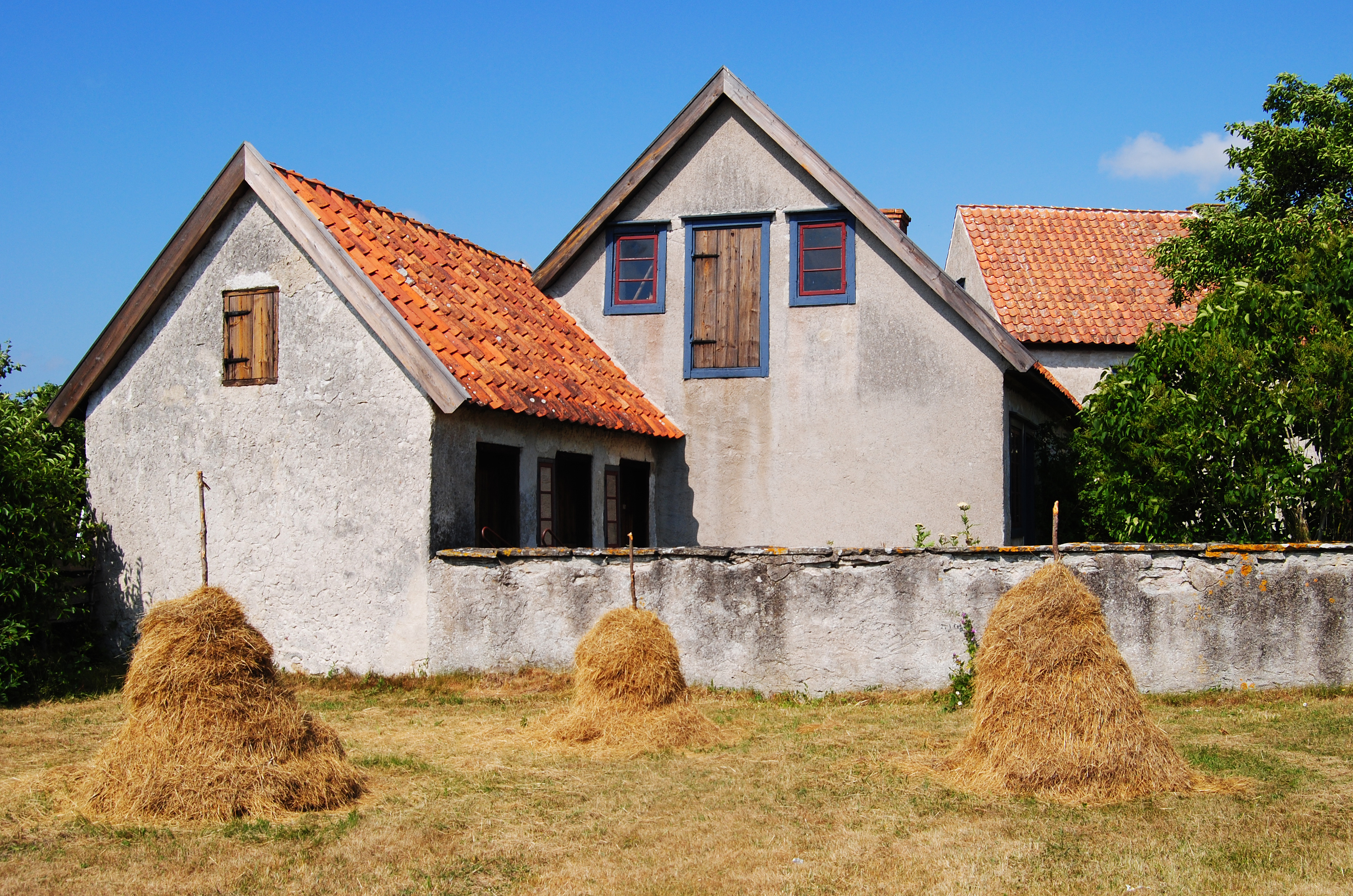
Petes, Hablingbo

Petes is a seaside farm in Hablingbo in the south part of Gotland. It is next to the Pete Cove on the western coast. The buildings on the farm are from the late 18th and 19th century. The year 1797, is carved on the stove in the main building. The farm was donated to Gotlands Fornvänner in 1965, by apothecary Ada Block in Visby, who had restored the farm and used it as summer residence. It is used by the museum to illustrate what life in the country on the island could be like during the 1800s.

=== Norrbys ===
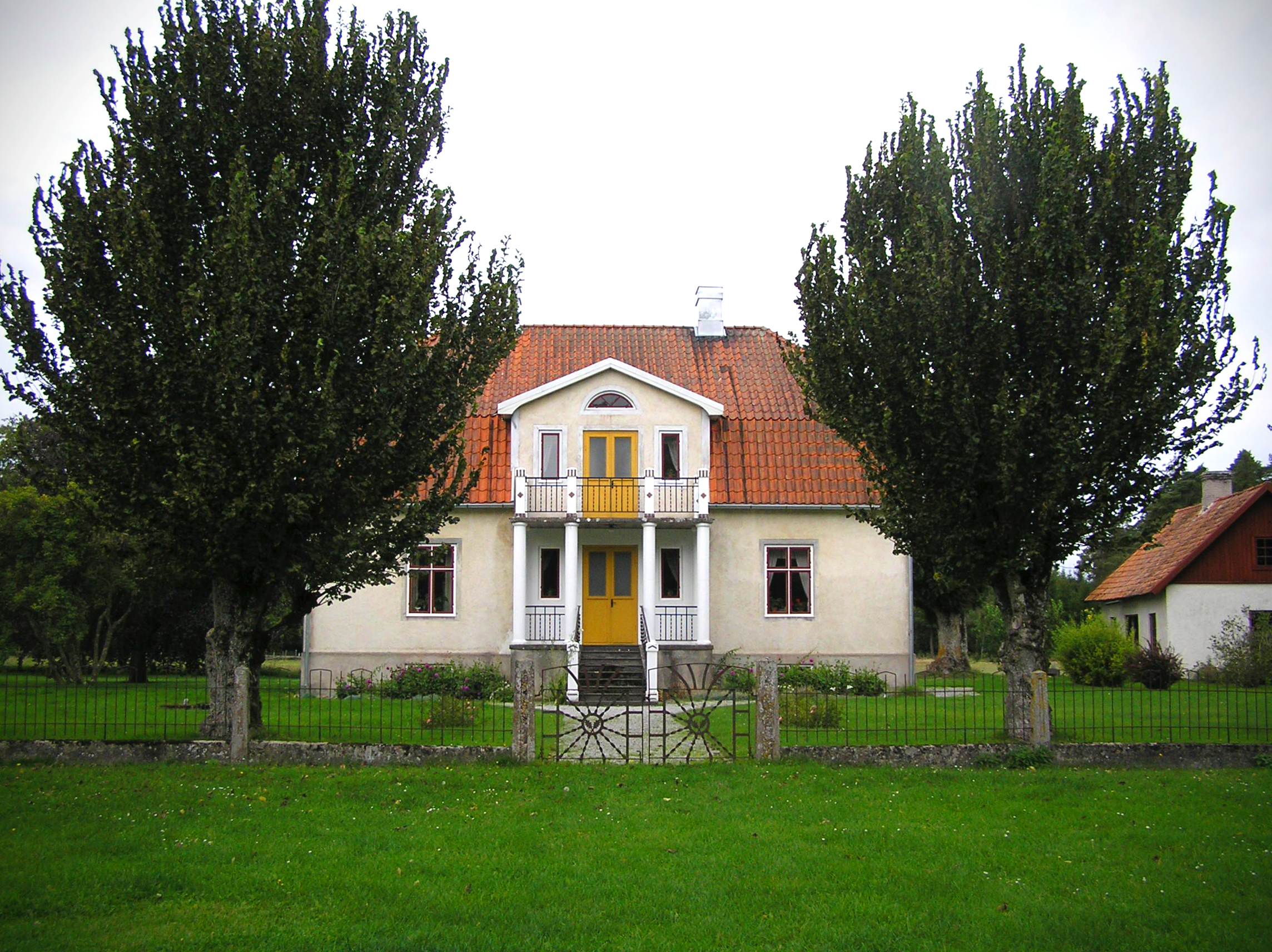
The main building at Norrbys

As of 2015 the Norrbys farm in Väte is the first and only Cultural Reserve in Gotland. It is kept in the state of a typical, working farm during the first half of the 1900s. The farm has been in the same family since 1728, and when the last owner, Martha Johansson died in 1995, she left it to Gotlands Fornvänner. The distribution of the land belonging to the farm has been left unaltered since the 1930s. The buildings and the land are now listed.

== Publishing House ==
The Fornsalen Publishing (the Fornsalens Förlag) is owned by the museum and specializes in literature with connections to Gotland. The company publishes three series of scientific journals, the Gotländskt Arkiv (Gotlandic Archive), Russi and Småskrifter från Gotlands Museum (Booklets from Gotland Museum). The publications from the house can be in any relevant language, and collaborations with museums and institutions from other countries are common.

== Gallery ==
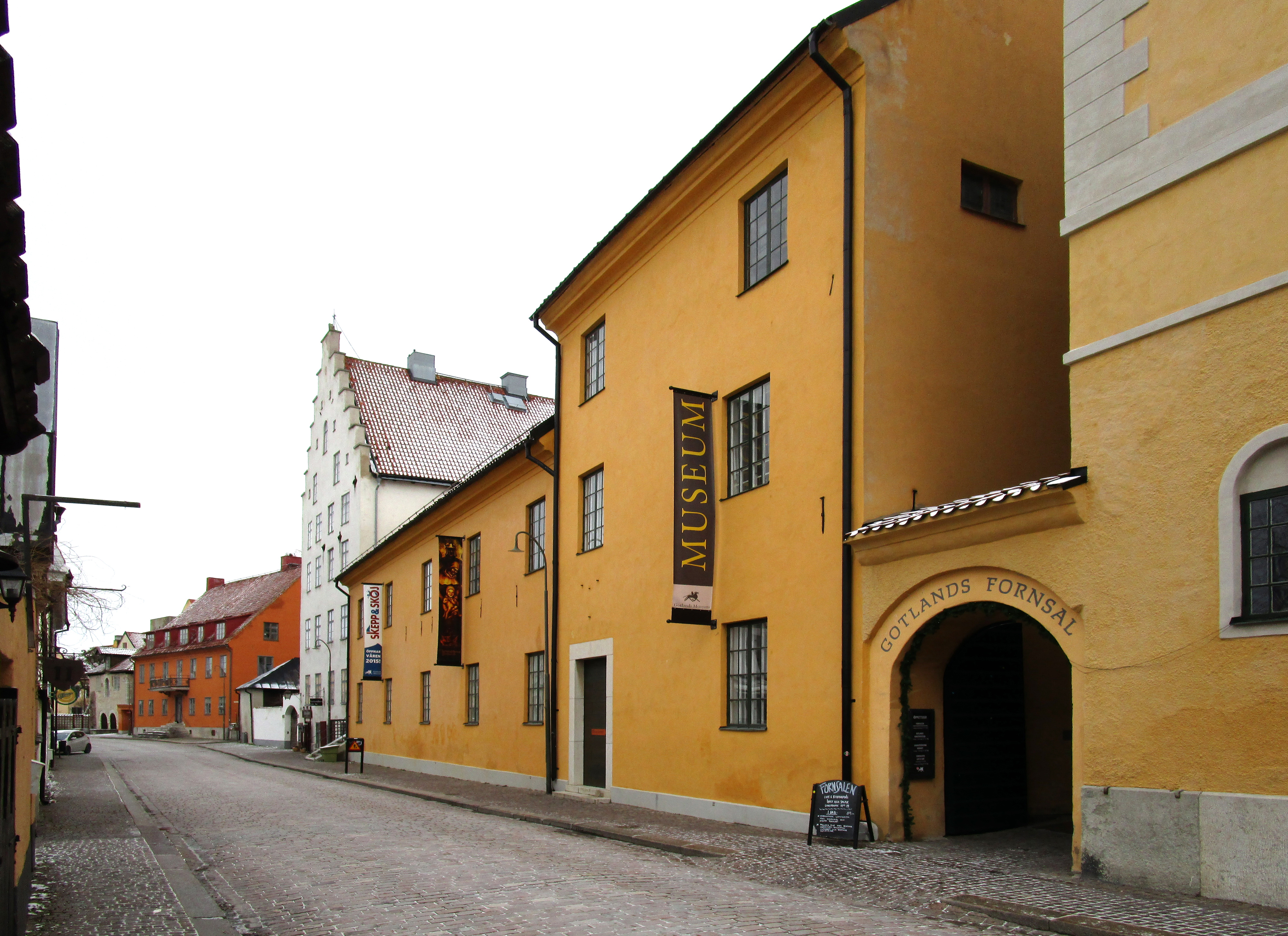
Facade at Strandgatan

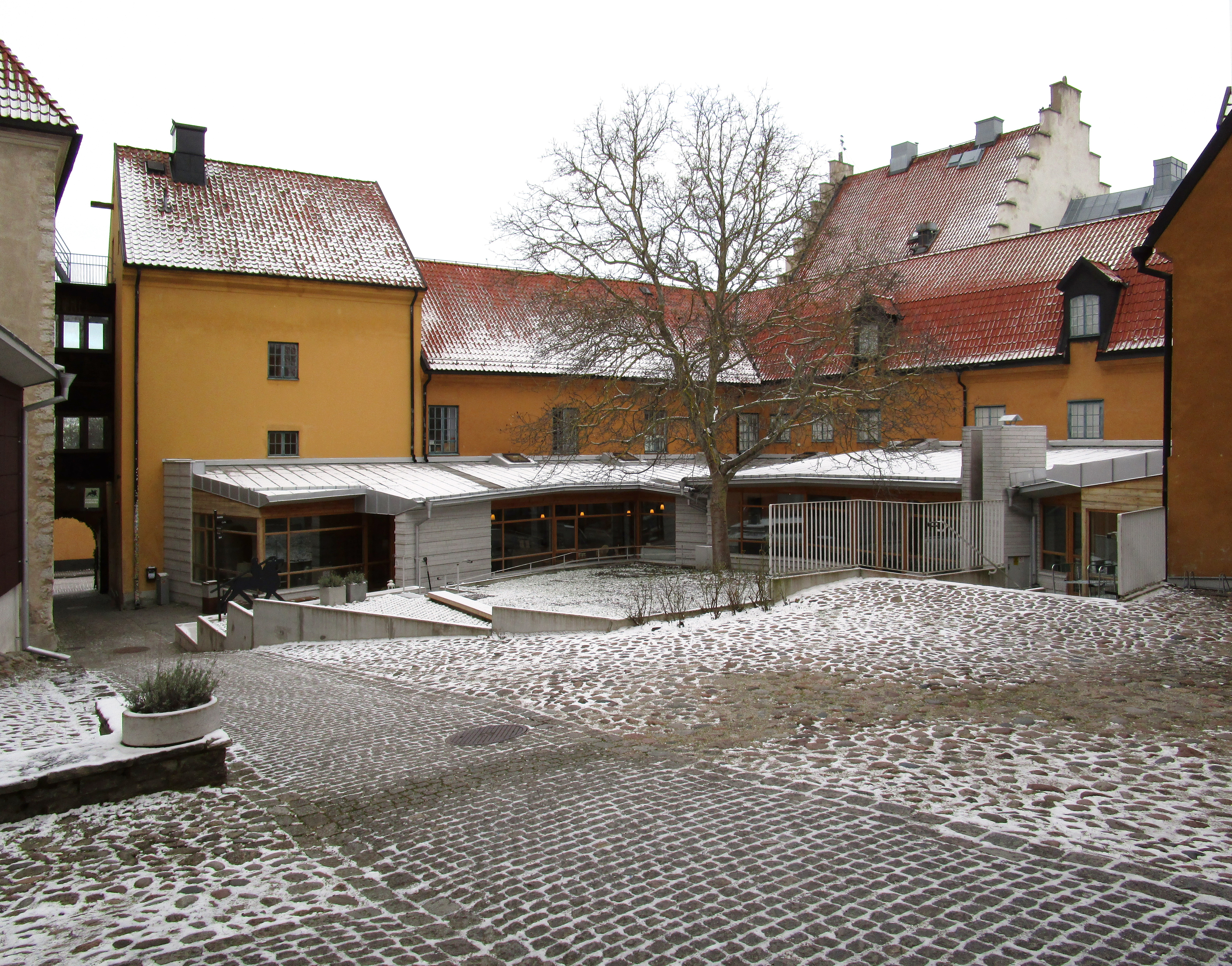
The inner yard with the café

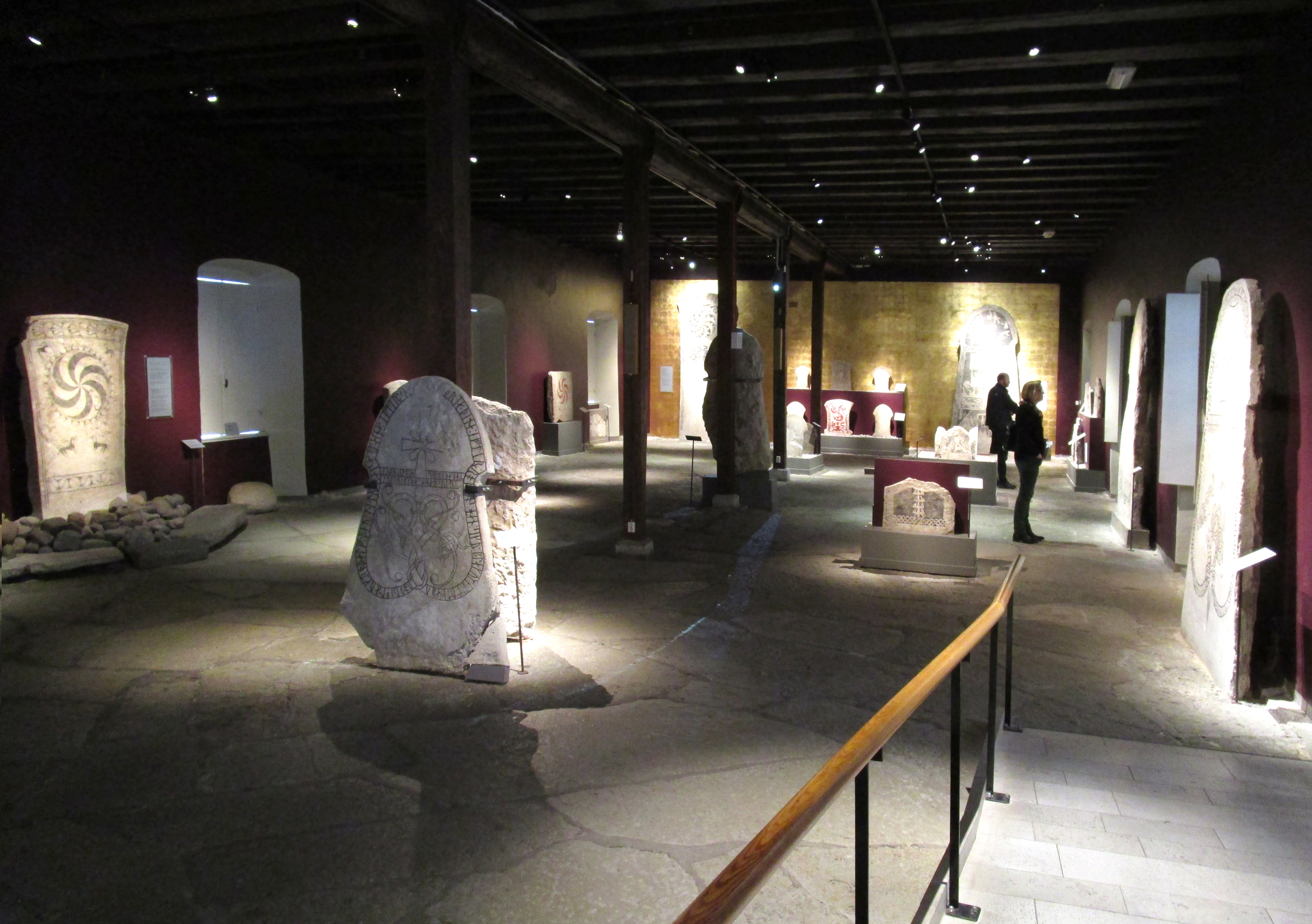
The picture stone hall, the original museum

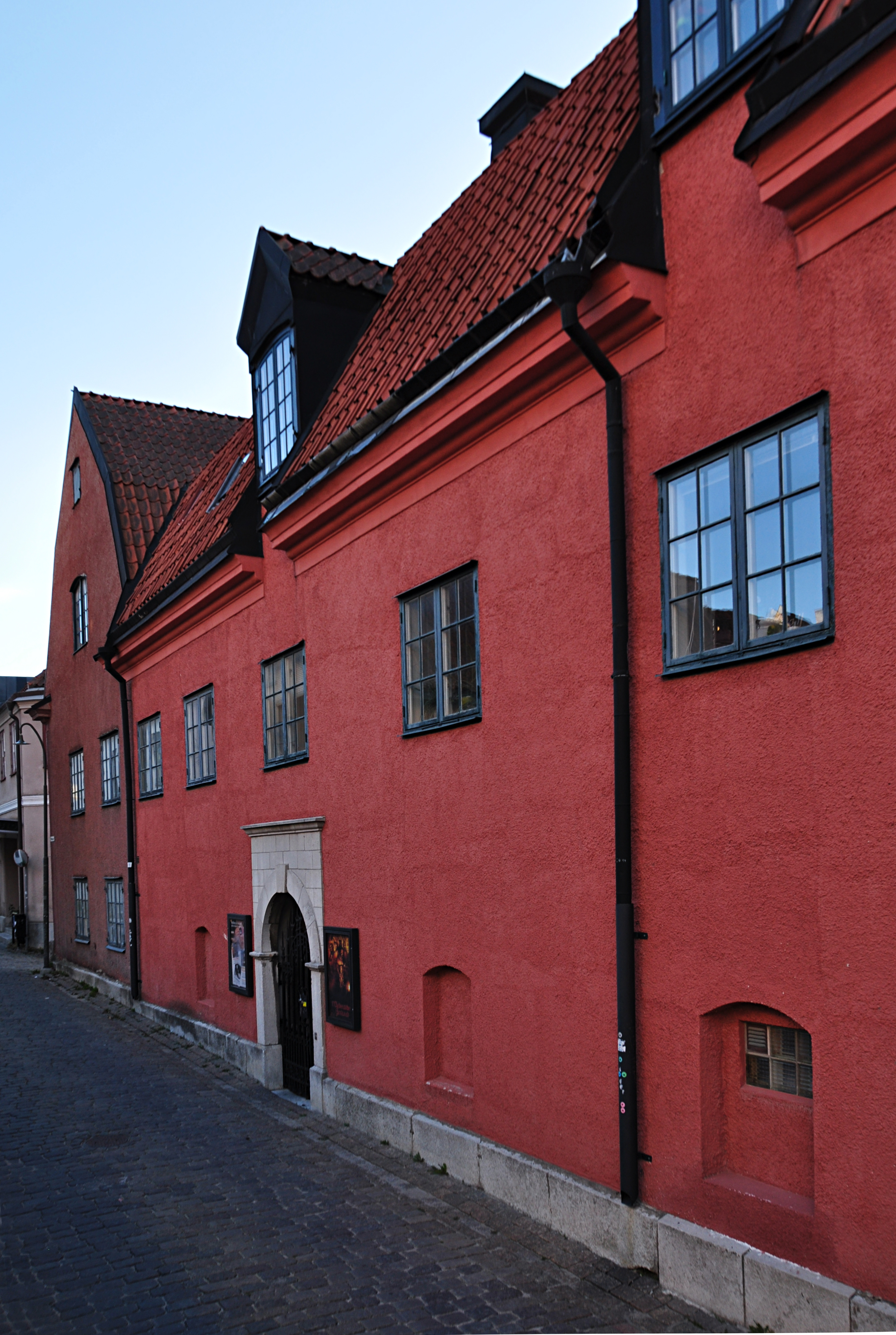
Facade at Mellangatan

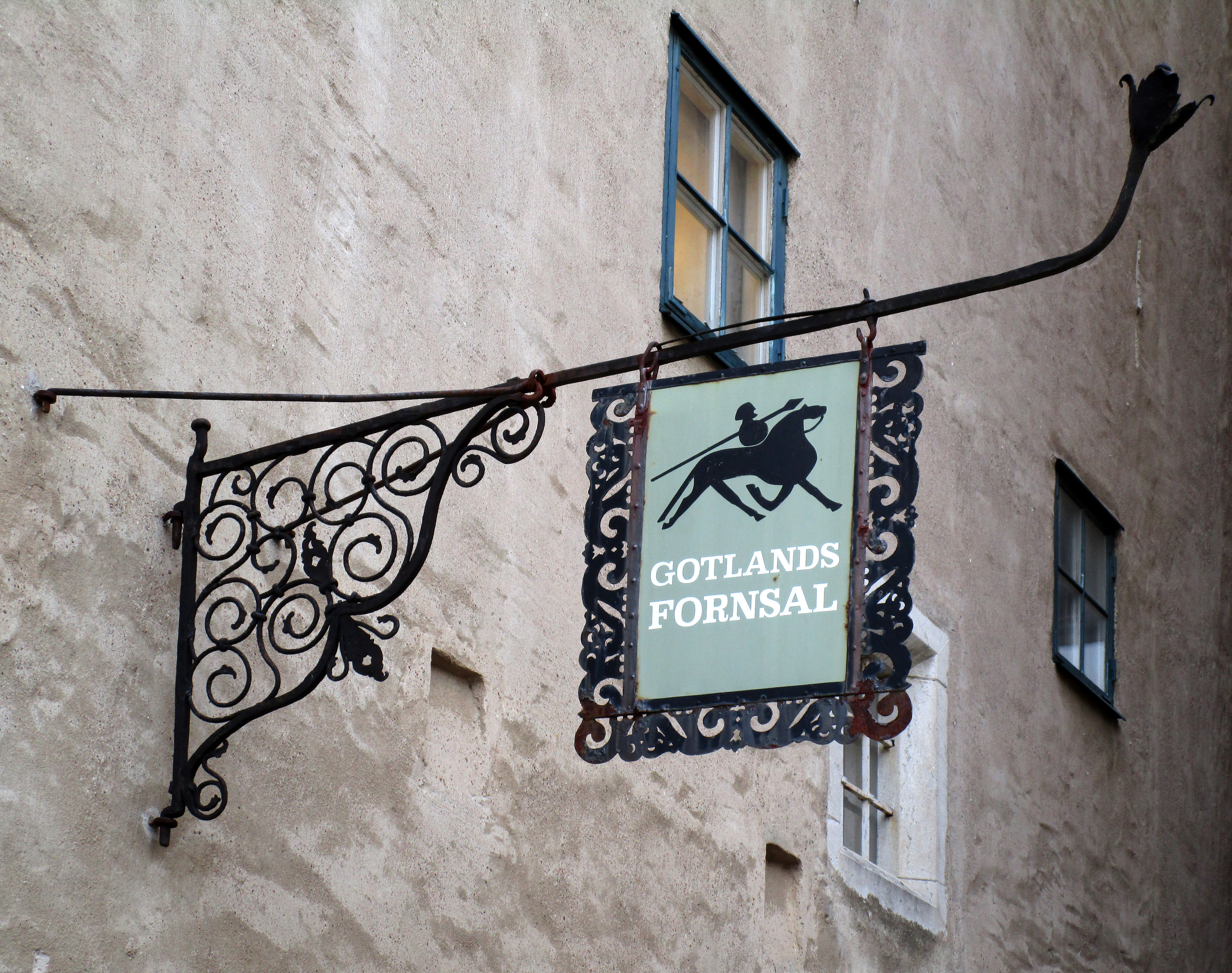
Original sign

== See also ==
- List of runestones
