= Calcarius (sculptor) =

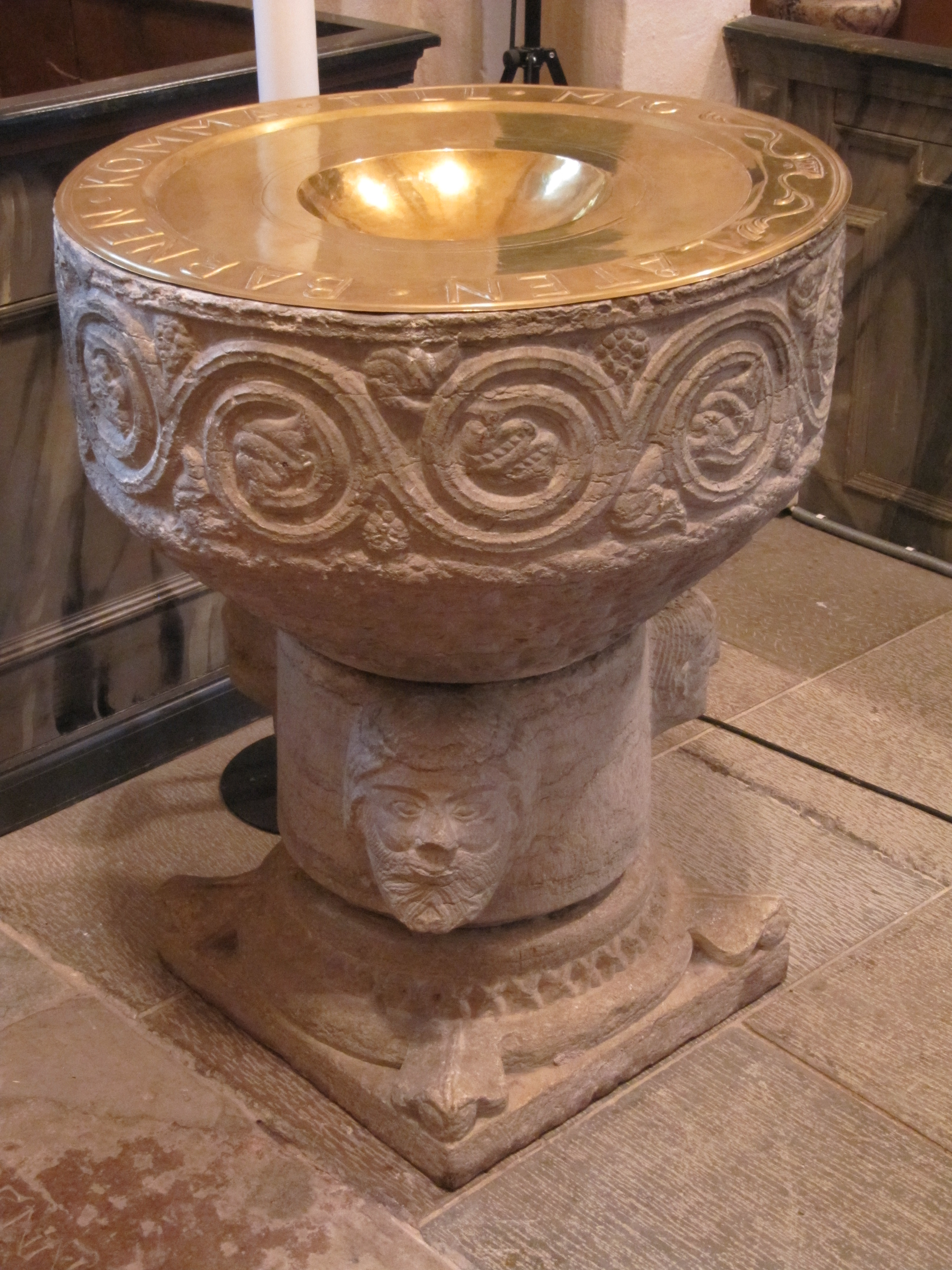
Baptismal font attributed to Calcarius in Lunda Church, Uppland (Sweden)

Calcarius (fl. second quarter of the 13th century) was an artist working in late Romanesque style on Gotland (present-day Sweden).

== Works ==
No written sources about Calcarius exist, and the name is a notname, chosen in the 20th century by art historian Johnny Roosval. It is derived from the fact that this artist was the first to cut sculptures from limestone rather than sandstone on a systematic basis on Gotland.

To the workshop of Calcarius around 20 baptismal fonts are attributed in the Baltic region. Only two of them are on Gotland (in Fole and Buttle Church), indicating that the workshop worked on an export market. The rest can be found in Ångermanland (Nora and Selånger Church), Medelpad (Stöde Church), Hälsingland (Njutånger Church), Uppland (Vidbo and Lunda Church), Östergötland (Gistad Church), Scania (Borrby Church), Öland (Bredsättra, Runsten and Ventlinge Church) and Bohuslän (Tossene Church) (all in Sweden), as well as in churches in Vestfold in present-day Norway, Falster in present-day Denmark and Schleswig-Holstein in present-day Germany. In addition, the workshop created sculptures for church buildings on Gotland. These include capitals and/or tympana on Havdhem, Tingstäde, Fole, Linde and Levide Church. A single sculpture in Visby Cathedral has also been attributed to the workshop of Calcarius.

== See also ==
- Byzantios
- Hegvald
- Majestatis
- Sigraf
