= Bulwark =

Bulwark primarily refers to:

- Bulwark (nautical), a nautical term for the extension of a ship's side above the level of a weather deck
- Bastion, a structure projecting outward from the curtain wall of a fortification

The Bulwark primarily refers to:

- The Bulwark (novel), a posthumous 1946 novel by Theodore Dreiser
- The Bulwark (website), an American news website launched in 2018

Bulwark may also refer to:

== Places ==
- Bulwark, Chepstow, Wales
- Bulwark, Alberta, Canada
- The Bulwark (Antarctica), a peak in Antarctica
- Bulwark Stream, a meltwater stream in Antarctica
- Bulverket, a lake Bulwark and platform from the 1130s in Lake Tingstäde, Sweden.

== Ships ==
- Bulwark-class battleship (1859), a class of Royal Navy wooden battleships
- HMS Bulwark, the name of several Royal Navy ships
- USS Bulwark, the name of several U.S. Navy ships

== Other uses ==
- Bulwark (comics), a fictional character in Marvel comics
- Bulwark (horse), sire of Åby Stora Pris winners
- Bulwark Protective Apparel, an American company

== See also ==
- Breakwater (structure)
