= Tingstäde =

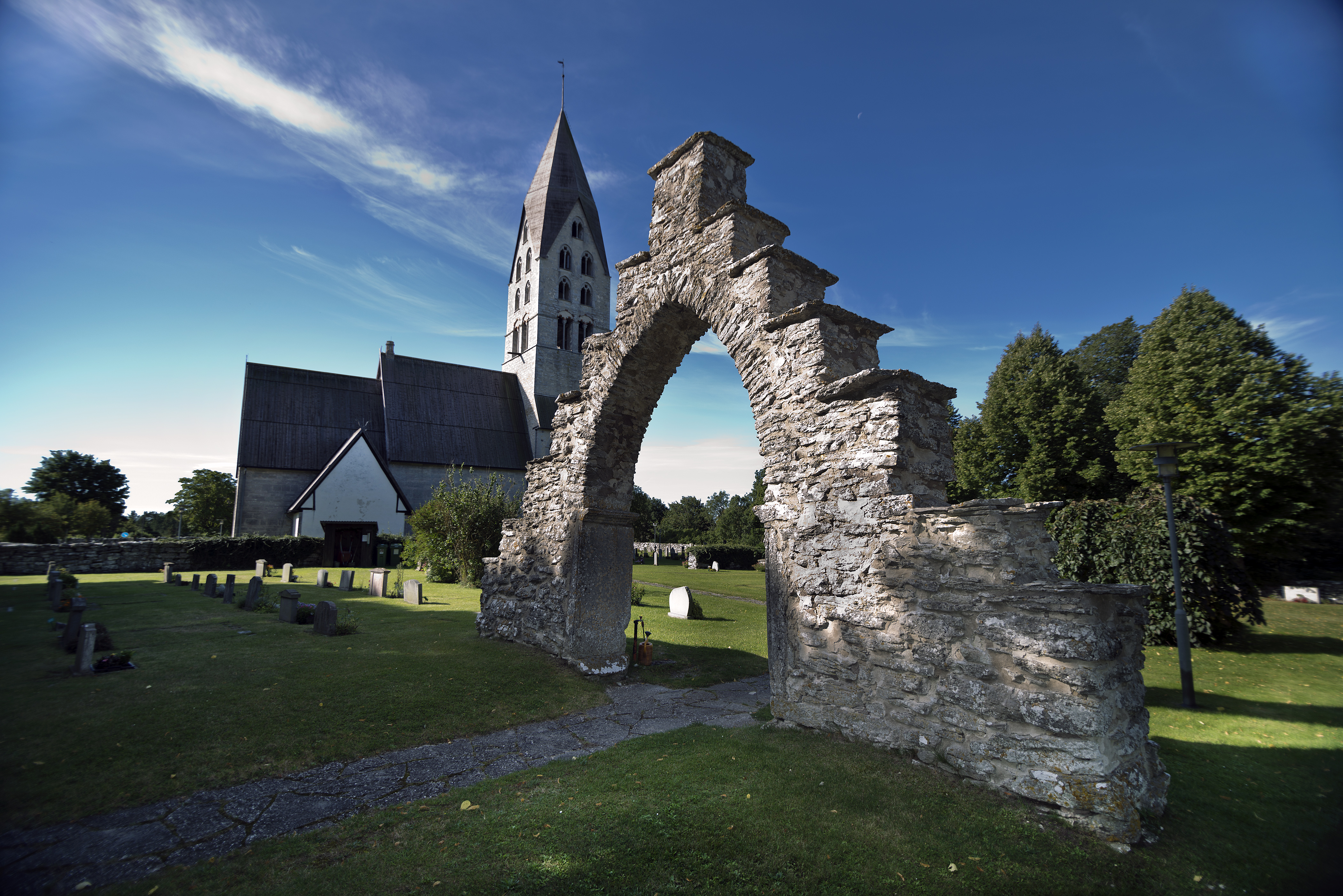
- Portal at Tingstäde Church

- Location within Gotland
- Coordinates: 57°44′N 18°35′E
- Country: Sweden
- Province: Gotland
- County: Gotland County
- Municipality: Gotland Municipality

Area
  - Total: 1.16 km^{2} (0.45 sq mi)

Population (31 December 2014)
  - Total: 372
- Time zone: UTC+1 (CET)
  - Summer (DST): UTC+2 (CEST)

Tingstäde is a populated area, a socken (not to be confused with parish), on the Swedish island of Gotland. It comprises the same area as the administrative Tingstäde District, established on 1 January 2016.

Tingstäde is most noted for its nearby lake Lake Tingstäde, which contains the sunken Bulverket fortification, built, used and abandoned during the 12th century.

== Geography ==
Tingstäde is the name of the socken as well as the district. It is also the name of the larger locality within the district and the small village surrounding the medieval Tingstäde Church, sometimes referred to as Tingstäde kyrkby. Tingstäde is located in the central north part of Gotland.

As of 2019, Tingstäde Church belongs to Stenkyrka parish in Norra Gotlands pastorat, along with the churches in Stenkyrka, Martebo, and Lummelunda.

One of the asteroids in the asteroid belt, 8679 Tingstäde, is named after this place.
