= Lummelunda Cave =

Cave in Gotland, Sweden

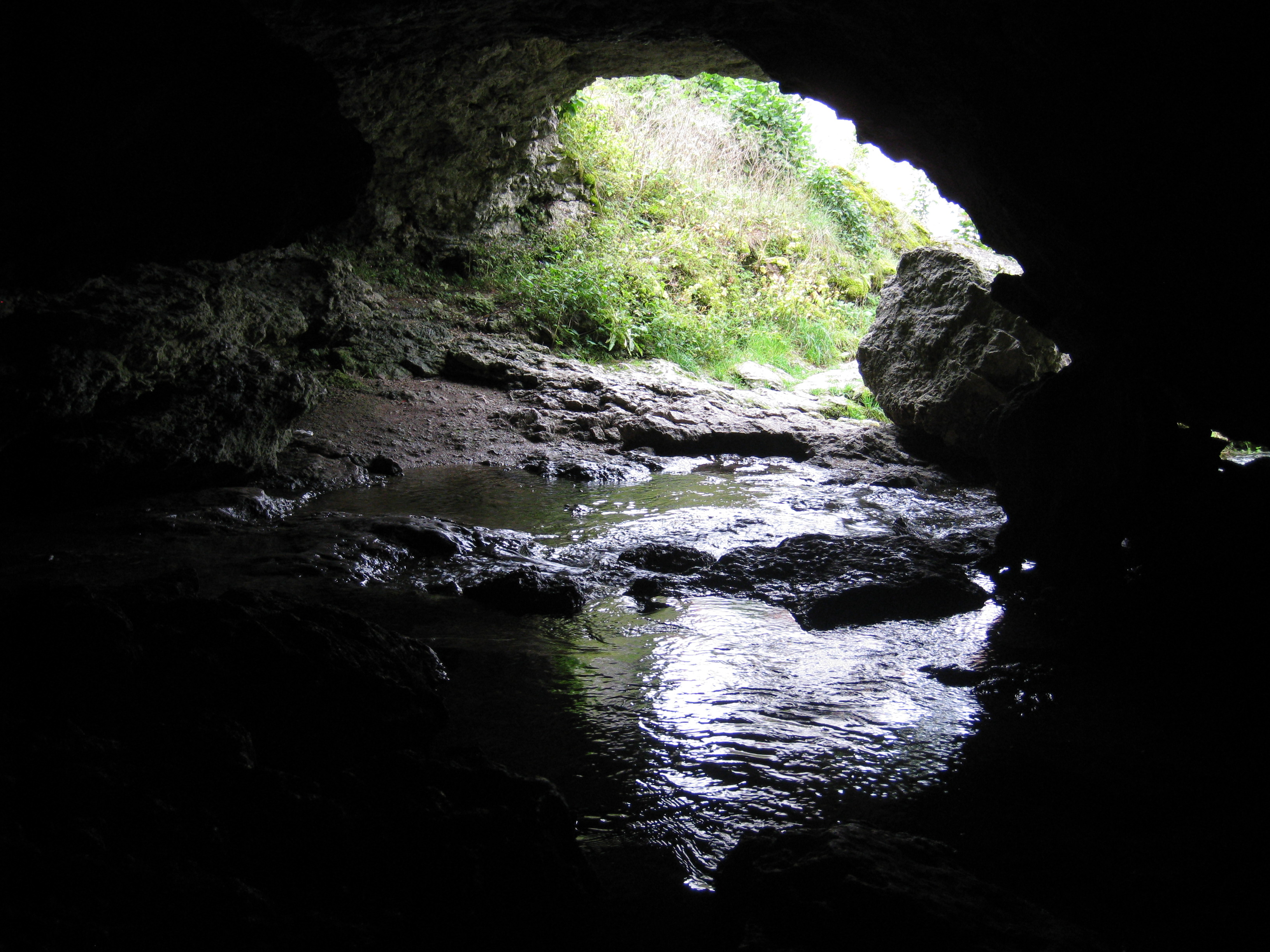
- Original entrance of the Lummelunda Cave

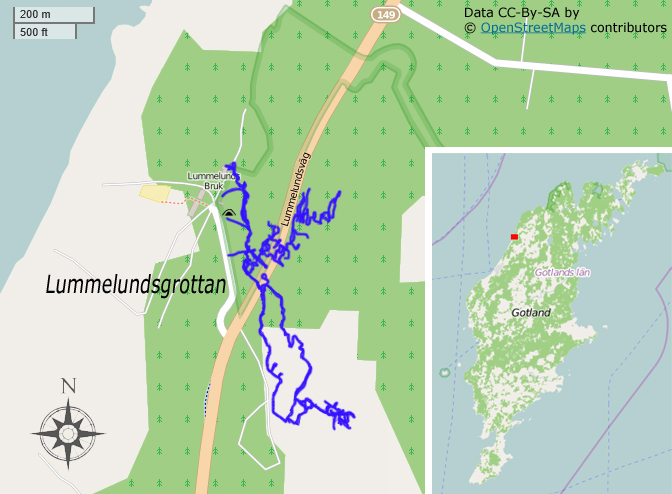
- Approximate location, size and shape of the explored parts of the Lummelunda Cave.
- Location: Lummelunda, Gotland, Sweden
- Coordinates: 57°44′16.8″N 18°24′18″E
- Length: 4.5 km (2.8 mi)
- Access: Daily tours May–September
- Visitors: 110,000
- Registry: Sveriges Speleologförbund – SSF
- Land registry number: 2364
- Website: lummelundagrottan.se

The Lummelunda Cave (Swedish: Lummelundagrottan, also known as the Rövarkulan, "The Robbers' Den") is located in a nature reserve at Lummelunda north of Visby on Gotland, Sweden. The explored part of this karst cave is almost 4.5 km (2.8 mi), making it one of the longest caves in Sweden. It is created by the drainage water from the Martebo mire. The water forms a stream with its outlet in the Baltic Sea. In the 15th to 19th centuries, mills and an ironwork were set up by the stream.

Although the entrance of the cave has been known for centuries, the main part of it was discovered by three teenage boys during the 1940s–50s. It is visited by around 100,000 people every year and is one of the major tourist attractions on Gotland.

== History ==
The cave was most likely formed before the last ice age. The water that creates it is drainage from the Martebo mire which is approximately 11 km (6.8 mi) east of Lummelunda. Most of the water runs as a stream, the Lummelundsån, through the north part of the cave system, exiting the limestone cliffs (known as the Klint) a few hundred meters from the coastline. The stream was much larger and more forceful before the mire, once the largest on Gotland, was drained at the end of the 19th century. The remaining drainage is led through an underground 1,150 m (3,770 ft) canal, dropping 17 m (56 ft) from Martebo mire to Lummelunda, at 400 liters/second.

The stream has been used for industry since the Middle Ages. According to an undocumented litigation in 1778, a mill was built at Lummelunda in 1418. The oldest reliable record is from 1594, where three mills are listed at the stream. In the 1620s, six mills were in use at the Lummelundsån. The cave itself has been known as long as the stream has been used. Carl Linnaeus wrote about the cave during his journey to Gotland in the summer of 1741. The part of the cave where the stream has its outlet, the Linné's Cave, is named after him. The Linné's Cave is 6 m (20 ft) wide, 3 m (9.8 ft) high and about 12 m (39 ft) long. The bottom of it is filled with water. The Lummelunda Cave is mentioned in the 1917 cave investigation made by geologist and Gotlander Henrik Munthe, where it is called Kytt-Janns källare ("Kytt-Jann's cellar").

The first documented attempt to explore the cave was made in 1924 by zoologist Torsten Gislén, but he never got further than 40 m (130 ft) into the cave despite several later attempts.

=== The Three Boys ===
The breakthrough in finding the cave system happened in 1948, when three teenage boys, Lars Olsson, Örjan Håkansson and Percy Nilsson, known as "The Three Boys" (De tre pojkarna), found an entrance to the rest of the cave. For seven years they explored the cave on Sundays using matches, candles, planks and a small boat to get deeper into the system.

After having explored the first hall of the cave for two years, a large block of stone fell from one of the walls, widening a small opening in the cliff. This led to a 20 m (66 ft) long passage (later called "The Boys' Passage", Pojkarnas gång) into the first large cave hall, "The Hall of the Mountain King" (Bergakungens sal). From 1959 onwards, this hall became the location for the start of the guided tours. A bit further in is "The Chapel" (Kapellet), named thus by the boys who thought it looked like a church, where their exploration was hindered by a lake. It was not until 1955, that they managed to get another 175 m (574 ft) further in, using an inflatable boat.

On 21 January 2011, "The Three Boys" were honored in a ceremony at the Campus Gotland. Lars Olsson died on 19 October 2011, Percy Nilsson died in December 2013 and Örjan Håkansson died in early 2021. All three were made honorary members of the Swedish Speleology Society (Sveriges Speleologförbund, SSF).

=== Further explorations ===
In 1959, a 60 m (200 ft) long tunnel was made from the surface to "The Hall of the Mountain King" to make the cave more accessible to visitors. Another 400 m (1,300 ft) of tunnels and the largest hall so far, was discovered by cave divers in September 1985, after they had passed four underwater passages (or "traps").

== Geology and geography ==
The Lummelunda Cave is situated in Lummelunda, about 13 km (8.1 mi) north of Visby. Its opening is behind the Lummelunda Manor at the old mill Överstekvarn ("Topmost Mill).

The cave is a karst cave, formed by surface water trickling down through cracks in the limestone of the Lower Visby Formation. When the surface water meets the groundwater, it starts to dissolve the limestone and widen the cracks into passages and halls. It is one of the longest caves in Sweden; the explored part of it is almost 4.5 km (2.8 mi) long.

33 sinkholes have been found in the main canal leading the water from Martebo mire to the cave. In the area west of the cliff there are five springs. After the draining of the mire the flow of water in the canal have decreased significantly, from 5.5 m^{3}/s (190 cu ft/s) in 1948, to 1.4 m^{3}/s (49 cu ft/s) in 1977. This has caused some of the sinkholes to disappear. During dry summers there is an impending danger that the cave is completely drained.

The cave is roughly divided into two parts: one dry, also called the fossil system, and a wet, active part. A large number of fossils and stalactite formations can be found in the dry part. The cave has a relatively stable climate with a humidity of 95–100%. According to a source from 1989, the temperature is on average 7 °C (45 °F) and points out that fluctuations in temperature have been noticed as a result of the many visitors. A source from 2011, states that the temperature is 8–12 °C (46–54 °F).

=== Nature reserve ===
A nature reserve to protect the Lummelunda Cave, was established on 20 March 1989. The reserve is 17 ha (42 acres); it includes the cave and the corresponding area above the ground and is called the Lummelunda Cave Nature Reserve (Naturreservatet Lummelundagrottan).

== Biology ==
At least 83 different species of animals including worms, spiders, centipedes, crayfish, beetles, butterflies, fish, mice and bats, have been found in the cave. Plants grow near the artificial lights in the outer parts of the cave. Since the plants are not a natural part of it, they are removed to keep the environment as original as possible. The many visitors also have a negative effect on the biology of the cave.

The landscape above the cave, which is also part of the nature reserve, is characterized by the karstification of the area. It is bisected by a steep cliff running in a north–south direction through the reserve. The eastern part on top of the cliff, is covered in pine forest, and the western part between the cliff and the shore is grassland with deciduous trees.

== Tourism and tours ==
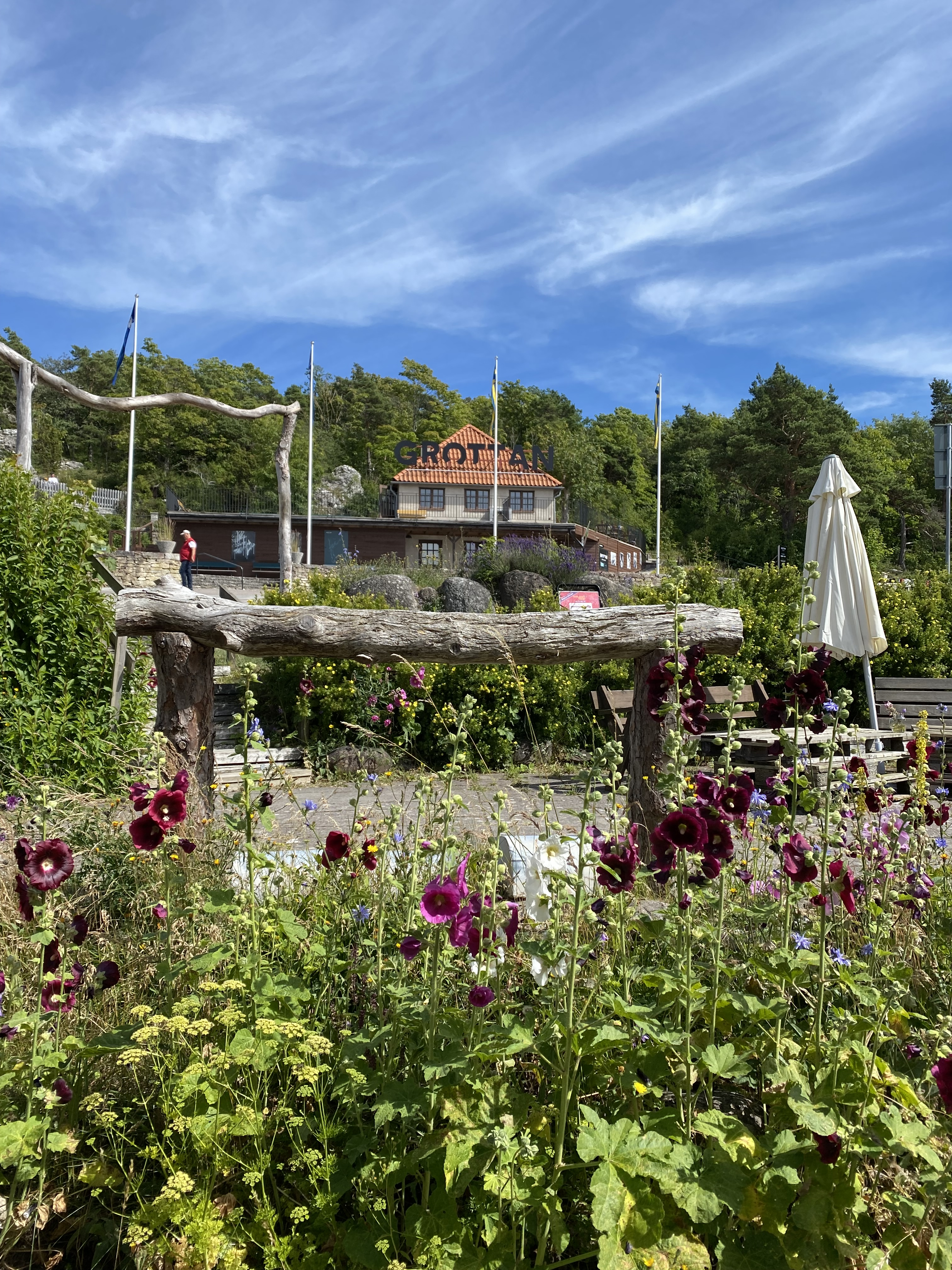
Lummelunda cave visitors center.

The Lummelunda Cave has been open to the public since 1959. It is visited by about 100,000 people each year, making it the most visited cave in Sweden, and one of the major tourist attractions on Gotland. "The Mountain King's Hall" and "The Chapel" (these combined are called the Visitors' Cave) are included in the regular tours. It is also possible to go another 500 m (1,600 ft) into the cave system with the special tours. These tours require a trained guide and visitors have to wear special gear and use small boats.

== Gallery ==
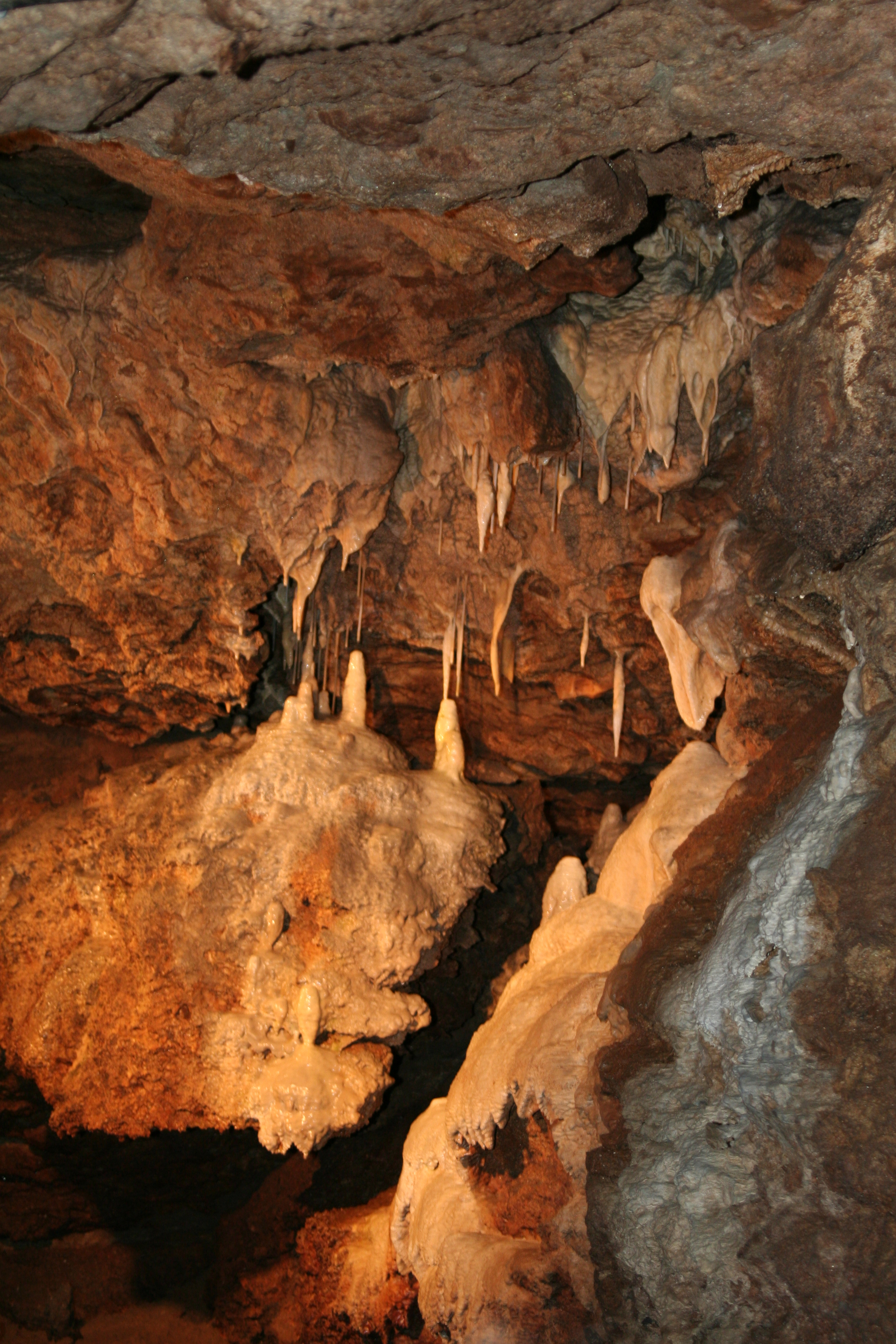
The stalactite and stalagmite formation known as the Jesus' family in the cave

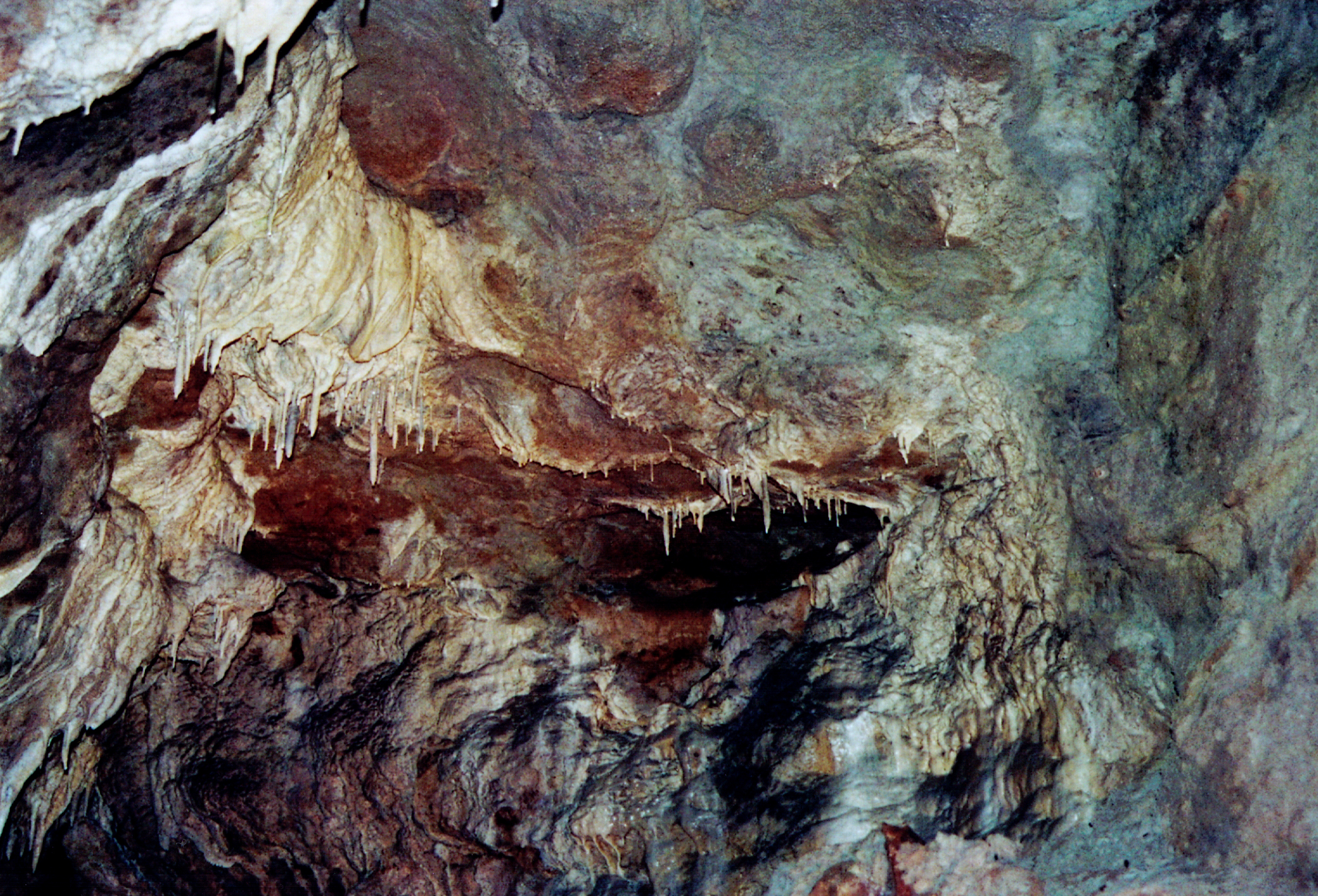
Stalactite drapery and straws in the Visitors Cave

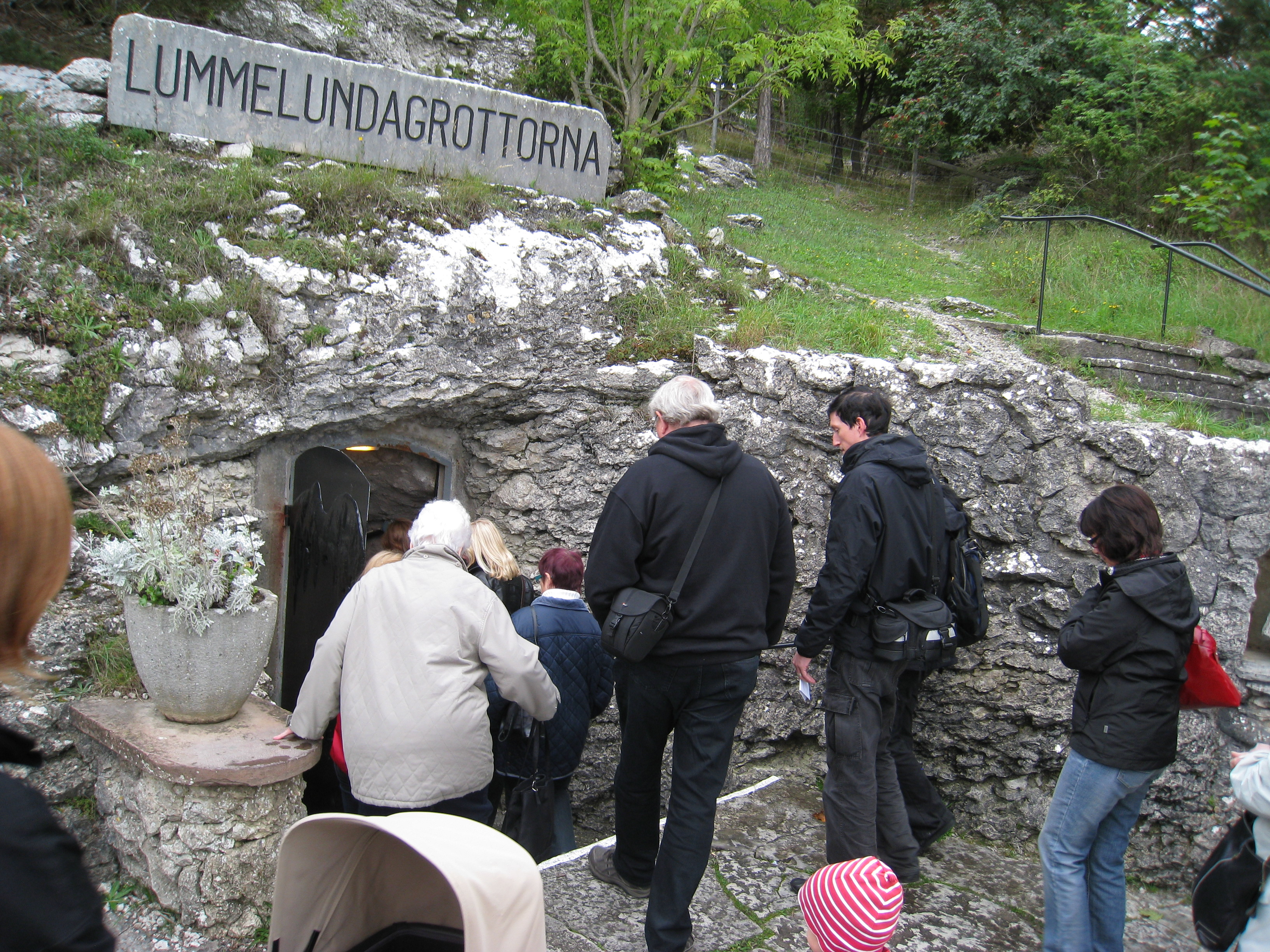
The tourist's entrance to the cave

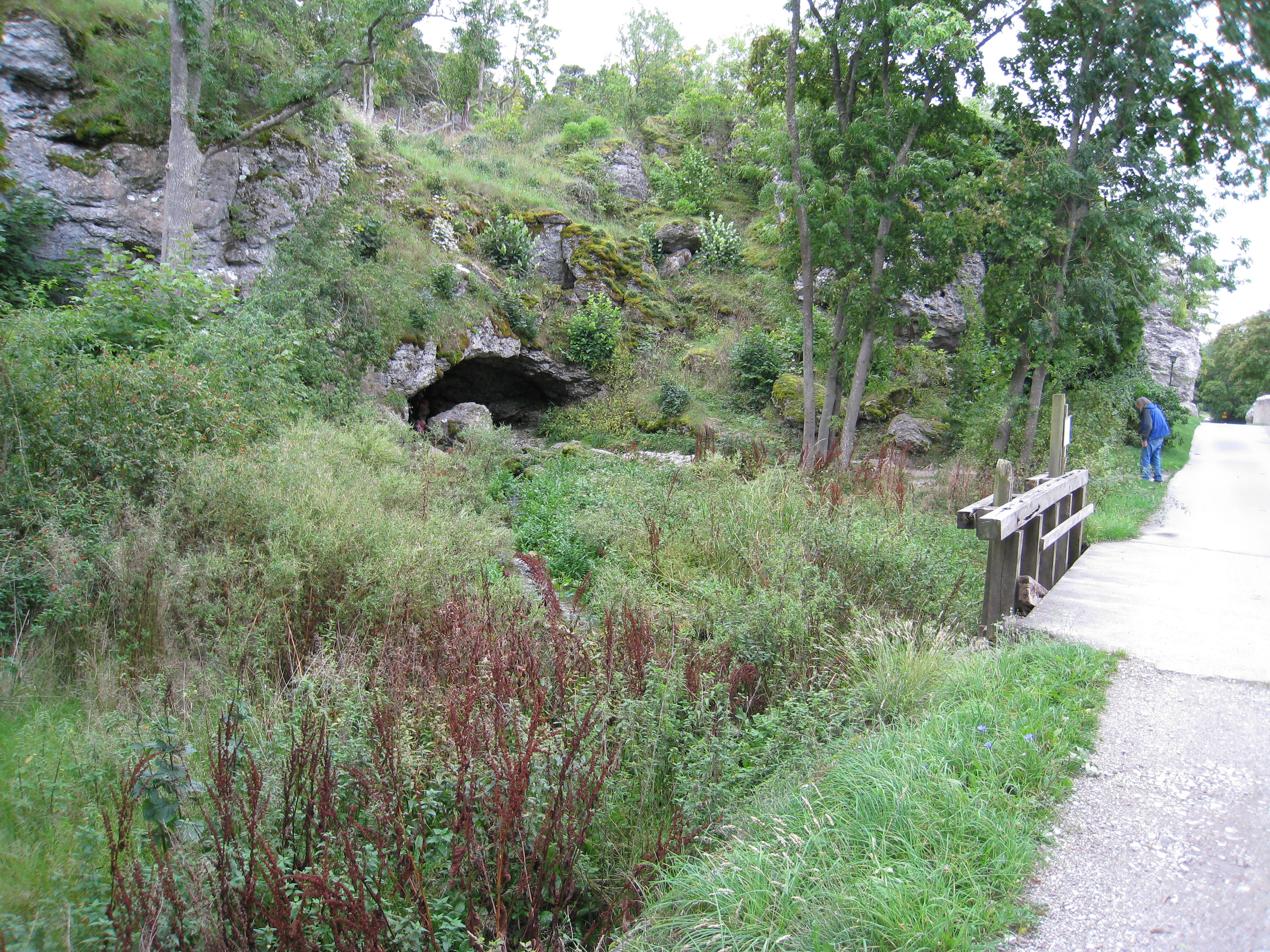
The entrance of the Linné's Cave

== See also ==
- List of caves
