= Martebo lights =

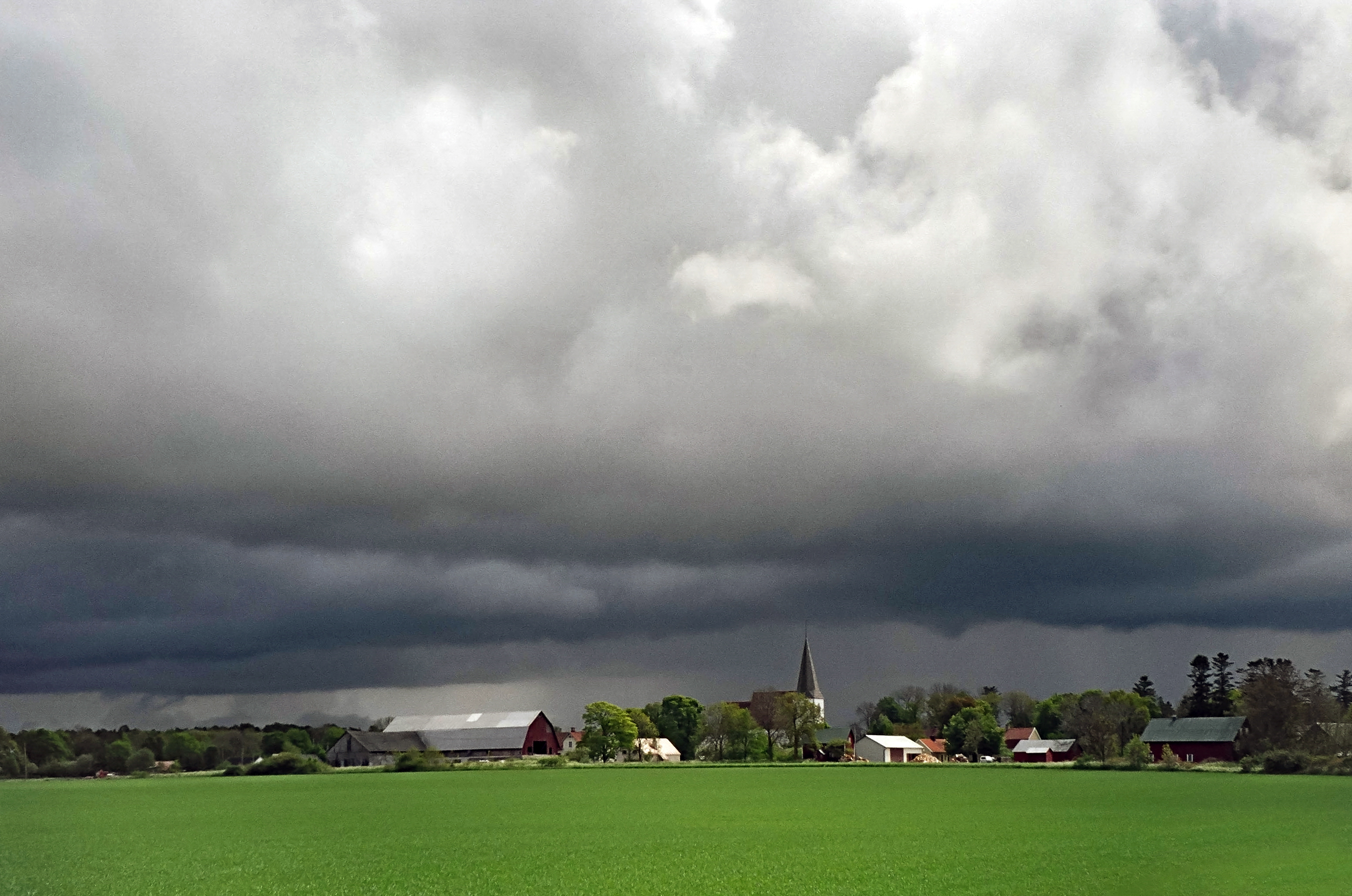
Farmlands around Martebo Church

The Martebo lights (in Swedish, "Marteboljusen" or "Marteboljuset") are "ghost lights" which have been seen since the early 1900s on a road in Martebo on the Swedish island of Gotland. In Sweden, it is believed that the will-o'-the-wisp represents the soul of an unbaptized person "trying to lead travelers to water in the hope of being baptized".
