= Stöde =

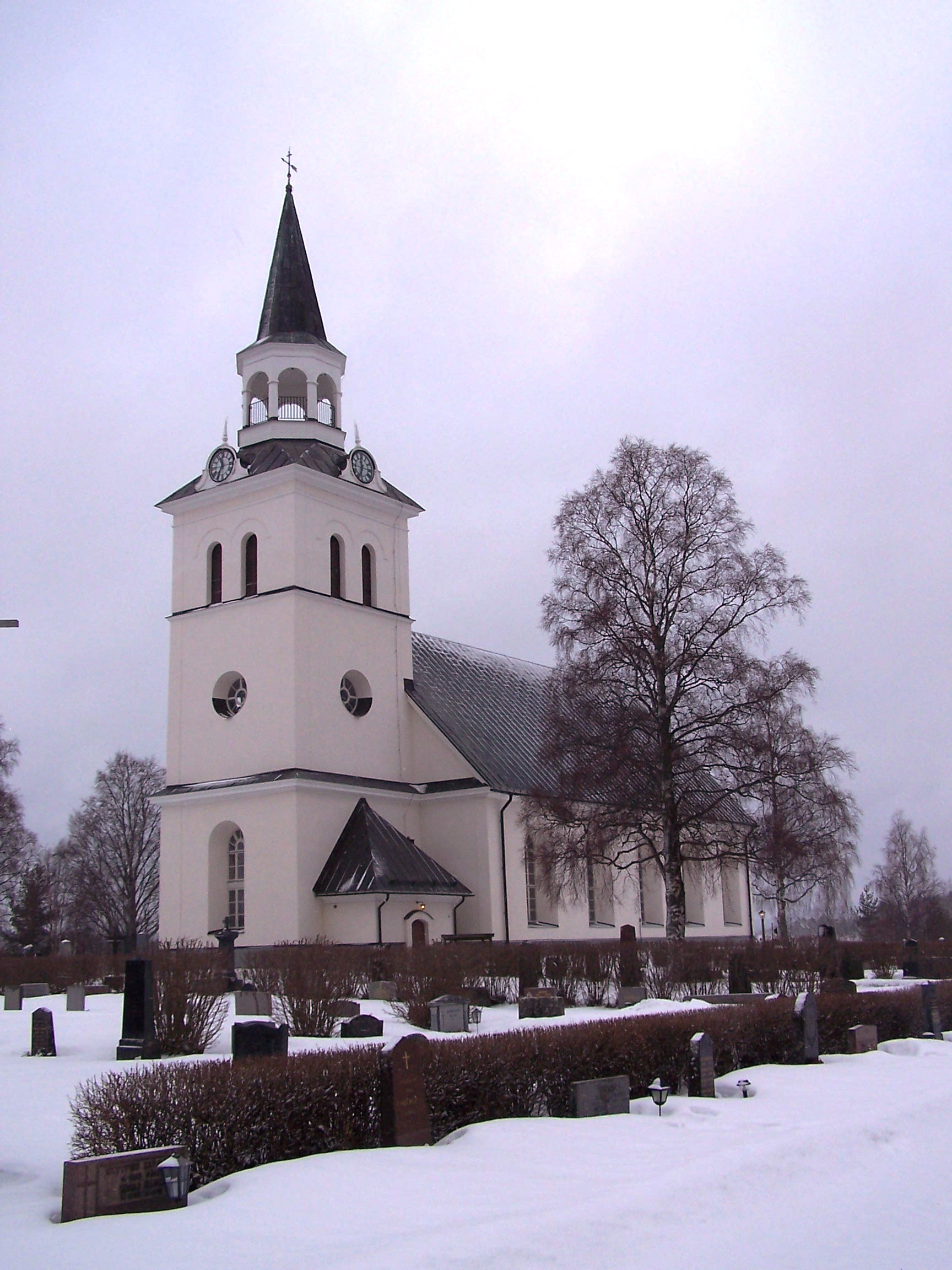
- Stöde Church

- Location within Västernorrland Location within Sweden
- Coordinates: 62°25′N 16°36′E
- Country: Sweden
- Province: Medelpad
- County: Västernorrland County
- Municipality: Sundsvall Municipality

Area
  - Total: 1.18 km^{2} (0.46 sq mi)

Population (31 December 2010)
  - Total: 572
  - Density: 486/km^{2} (1,260/sq mi)
- Time zone: UTC+1 (CET)
  - Summer (DST): UTC+2 (CEST)

Stöde is a locality situated in Sundsvall Municipality, Västernorrland County, Sweden with 572 inhabitants in 2010.
