= Lummelunda Church =

- Lummelunda kyrka
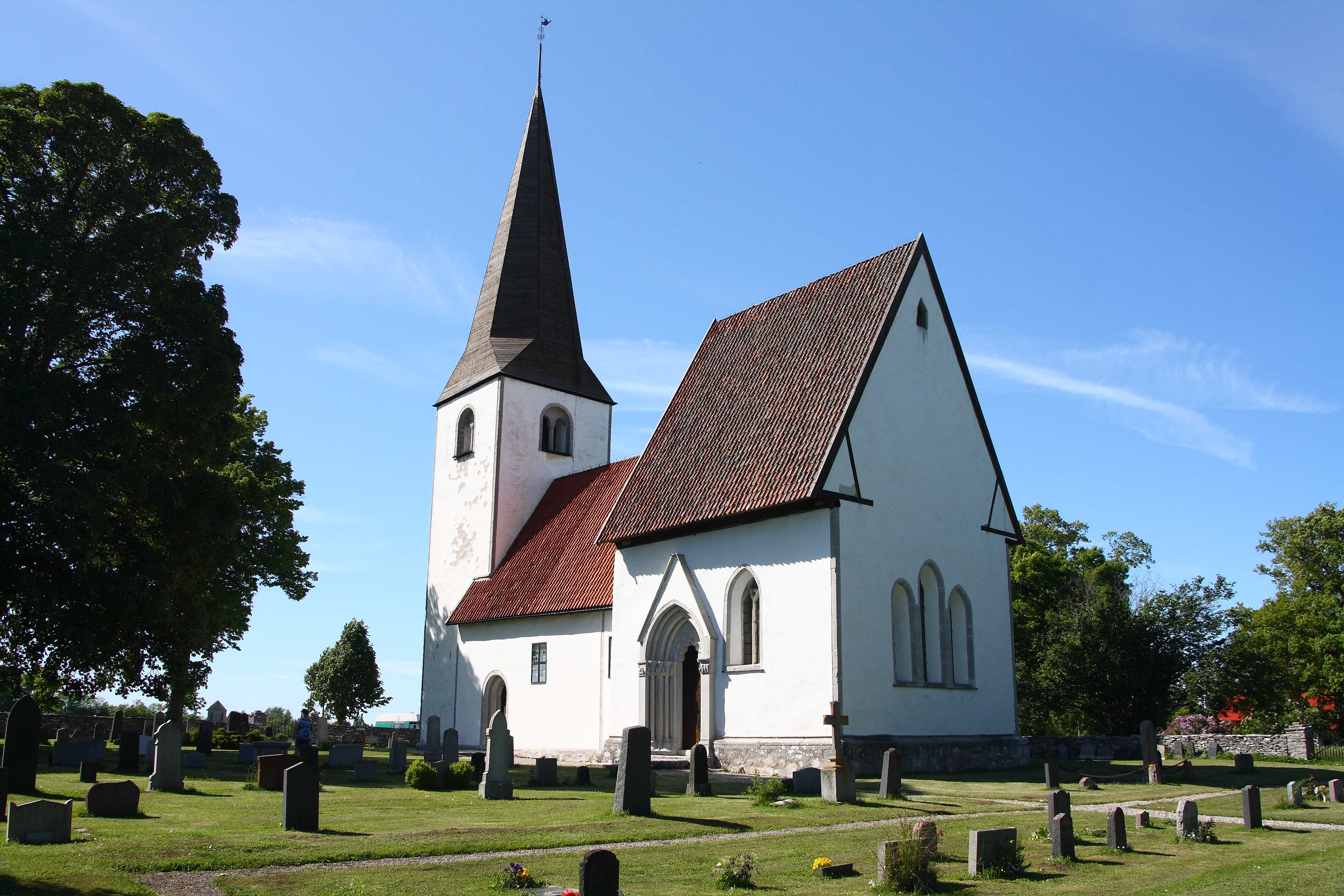
- Lummelunda Church, view of the exterior

- Location on Gotland
- 57°46′11″N 18°27′20″E
- Country: Sweden
- Denomination: Church of Sweden

Administration
- Diocese: Visby

Lummelunda Church (Swedish: Lummelunda kyrka) is a medieval church in Lummelunda on the Swedish island of Gotland. The oldest parts were built circa 1200, and the last major alterations made in the 14th century when a new choir was built. It belongs to the Diocese of Visby.

== History and architecture ==
The nave and tower are the oldest parts of the church in Lummelunda. They were both erected circa 1200. Originally, a choir built at the same time formed part of the church. This choir was razed in the middle of the 14th century, and the present, disproportionately large choir was built instead. The rebuilding of the choir was intended as the beginning of a complete reconstruction scheme, but only the choir was executed. The church has remained largely unaltered since then. The sacristy is of unknown date, mentioned for the first time in 1739, and the church spire dates from 1636. During the 17th century, new windows were added to the nave, it received new furnishings and was re-decorated inside. The windows were again altered during the 19th century. A renovation was carried out in 1960-61.

Architecturally, the church is characterised externally by the large Gothic choir and the much smaller Romanesque nave and tower. It is built in limestone. The main, southern portal is decorated with stone sculptures similar to those of Martebo Church, but somewhat cruder in execution. Inside, the church is decorated with murals. Of these, some date from the construction period of the church, some from the 15th century and some from the 17th century. The church houses a single, rather worn late medieval wooden sculpture depicting Saint Anthony. Most other furnishings are from the 17th century.
