= Lummelunda =

Lummelunda Lummelunda and Etebols
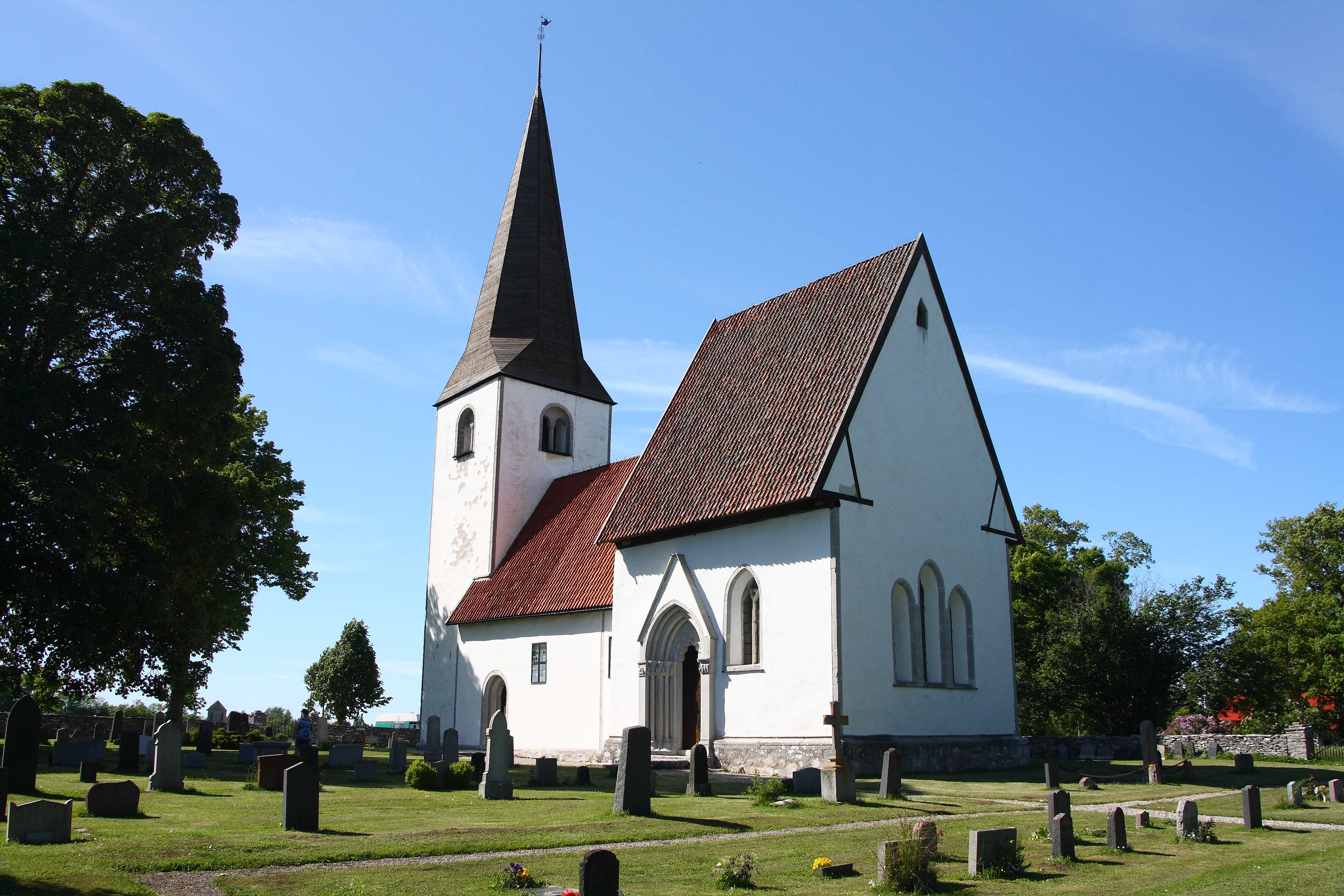
- Lummelunda Church

- Location within Gotland
- Coordinates: 57°46′21.3″N 18°26′39.0″E
- Country: Sweden
- Province: Gotland
- County: Gotland County
- Municipality: Gotland Municipality

Area
  - Total: 23.79 km^{2} (9.19 sq mi)

Population (2014)
  - Total: 447
- Time zone: UTC+1 (CET)
  - Summer (DST): UTC+2 (CEST)
- Website: lummelundaannorlunda.se

Lummelunda (sometimes referred to as Lummelunda and Etebols) is a populated area, a socken (not to be confused with parish), on the Swedish island of Gotland. It comprises the same area as the administrative Lummelunda District, established on 1 January 2016.

Lummelunda is most noted for the Lummelunda Cave, one of the longest caves in Sweden, and the mill with the largest water wheel in northern Europe.

== Geography ==
Lummelunda is on the northwest coast of Gotland with the Lummelunda stream to the south, approximately 17 km (11 mi) north of Visby. The land is mainly plains with high and steep, forested cliffs to the north. Lummeluda is a farming district. On the Lummelunda coast next to the local hostel is Nyhamn harbor and fishing village, dating back to the 17th centurtry.

One of Sweden's longest caves, the Lummelunda Cave, is situated at Lummelunda. The cave is part of a nature reserve with the same name as the cave, Lummelundagrottan. The reserve, established in 1989, is 17 ha (42 acres) and includes the cave and the ground above it.

The Lummelunda Church is medieval. As of 2019, Lummelunda Church belongs to Stenkyrka parish in Norra Gotlands pastorat, along with the churches in Stenkyrka, Martebo and Tingstäde.

One of the asteroids in the asteroid belt, 10132 Lummelunda, is named after this settlement.

== History ==
The name is probably from the vicarage, in 1350 known as Lomalunda. The meaning of the first part of the name is unknown, the second part lund means "grove", can have been intended for a sacred grove.

A couple of graves from the Stone Age has been found at Lummelunda, as well as fifteen grave fields from the Iron Age and ground grooves on both boulders and slabs.

During the use of the Swedish allotment system, the boatswains of Lummelunda were part of the 1st Gotlandic Boatswain Company.

=== Mills ===
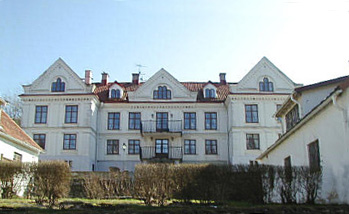
Lummelunda Manor

The water in the Lummelunda stream has been used for industry since the Middle Ages. Three mills are named, the Topmost (Översta kvarn), the Middle (Mellersta kvarn) and the Lowest (Nedersta kvarn). The water wheels were used for grinding grains, saw mills and textile mills for manufacturing wadmal. The height of the industry at Lummelunda was during the 17th century, when ironworks at the stream processed iron ore shipped from Utö in the Stockholm archipelago. As of 2015, only the Topmost Mill remains. It has the largest water wheel in northern Europe. The adjacent Lummelund Manor was built in the 1805.
