= Lake Tingstäde =

Lake in the country of Sweden

- Tingstäde träsk (Swedish)
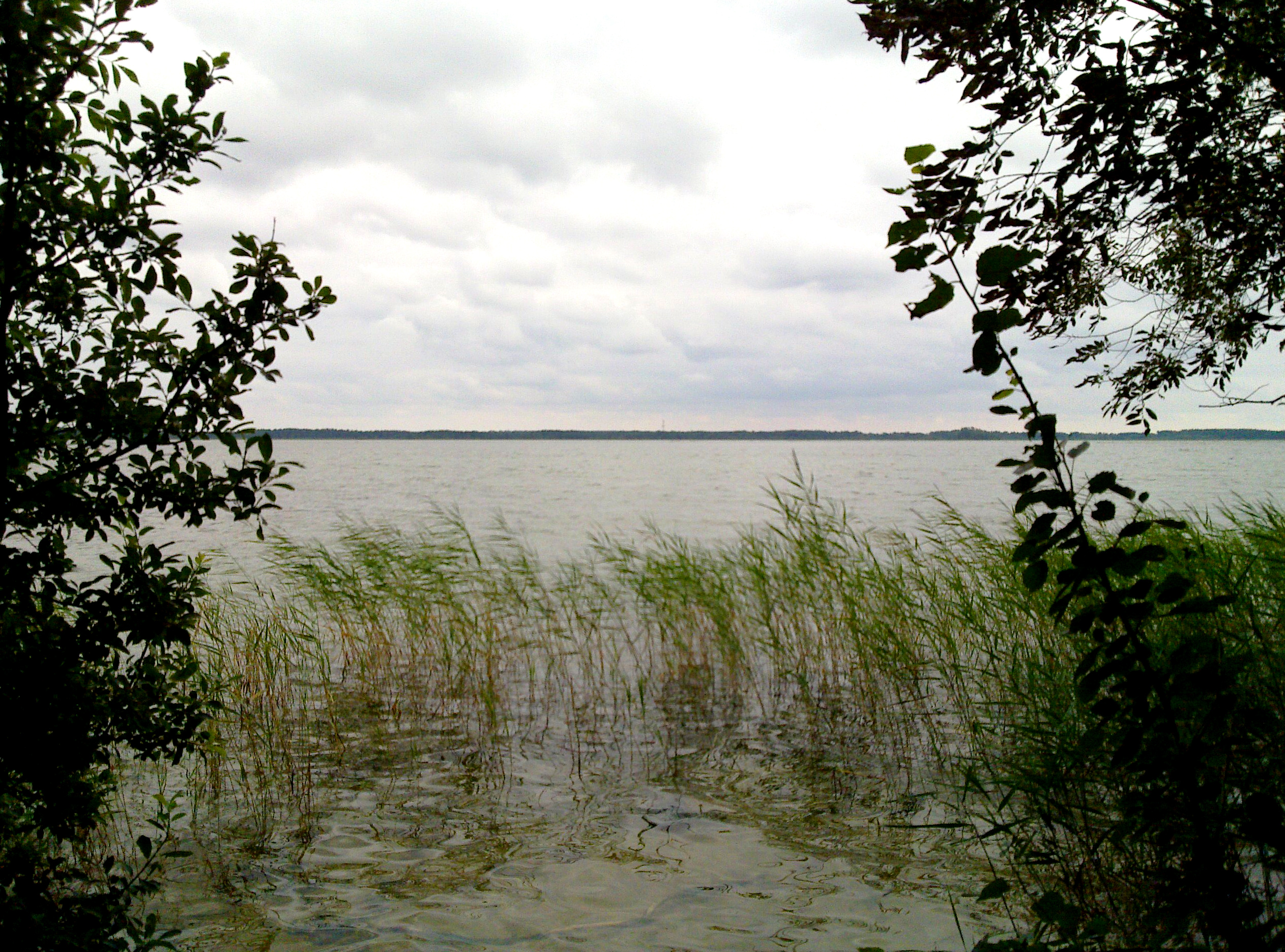

- Location within Gotland
- Location: Tingstäde socken, Gotland
- Coordinates: 57.72823°N 18.63078°E
- Type: freshwater lake
- Primary outflows: Gothemsån-Snoderåns coastal areas
- Basin countries: Sweden
- Surface area: 4.68 km^{2} (1.81 mi^{2})
- Average depth: 0.7 m (2.3 ft)
- Max. depth: 1.7 m (5.6 ft)
- Water volume: 3,243,000 m^{3} (114,500,000 ft^{3})
- Shore length^{1}: 104 km (65 mi)
- Surface elevation: 44.1 m (145 ft)
- Frozen: winter
- Settlements: Tingstäde
- ^{1} Shore length is not a well-defined measure.

Lake Tingstäde is a lake next to Tingstäde in the central northern part of Gotland, Sweden. It is the second biggest lake on Gotland, after Lake Bästeträsk. The surface of the lake is 44.1 m (145 ft) above sea level.

The lake was used as a landing site for seaplanes during the interwar period, such as the first regular passenger planes between Gotland and mainland Sweden 1933–39, and a stopover on the Stockholm/Lindarängen - Danzig line, serviced by the AB Aerotransport in 1925–26.

== History ==
During the 1120s, a 170 by 170 m (560 by 560 ft) square timber platform was built in the middle of the lake. On the platform was a number of closely built wooden houses. The remnants of this construction, known as the Bulverket, are still present on the bottom of the lake. It is still not known why the bulwark was built.

The name Tingstäde is probably related to the thing that was located north of the Tingstäde Church close by the lake. The word träsk is an old Gutnish word for 'lake'.

== Biology ==
Lake Tingstäde is one of Gotland's most biologically diverse lakes. It contains pike, perch, ruffe, roach, bleak, tench, rudd and carp. There are also crayfish in the lake.
