= Fole Church =

- Fole kyrka
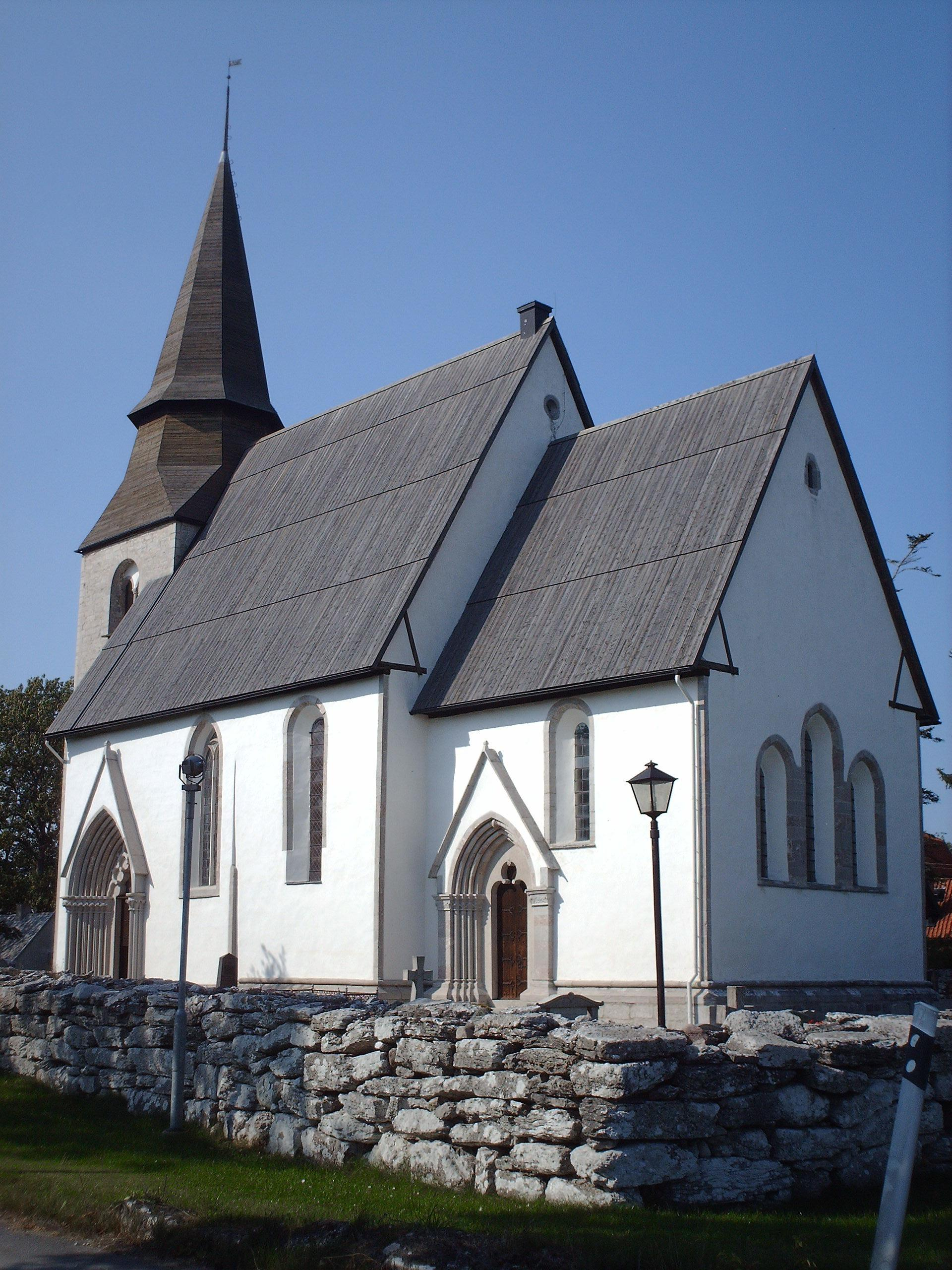
- Fole Church, view of the exterior

- Location on Gotland
- 57°39′02″N 18°32′42″E
- Country: Sweden
- Denomination: Church of Sweden

Administration
- Diocese: Visby

Fole Church (Swedish: Fole kyrka) is a medieval church in Fole on the Swedish island of Gotland. The Romanesque tower is the oldest part of the otherwise largely Gothic church. It belongs to the Church of Sweden and lies in the Diocese of Visby.

== History ==
The present church was preceded by a Romanesque stone church. Of this church, the tower remains and is thus the oldest part of Fole Church. It dates from circa 1200. The Romanesque church was gradually replaced with the current, more Gothic church. During the middle of the 13th century, the choir and about half of the nave were rebuilt, and a few decades later, the rest of the nave. The rebuilt church was inaugurated in 1280.

The church has remained relatively intact since. The sacristy was redecorated in 1707, and minor alterations to the interior have been made occasionally throughout the centuries.

Today, Fole Church belongs to the Church of Sweden and lies within the Diocese of Visby.

== Architecture ==
The church exterior has both Gothic and Romanesque elements. The tower is Romanesque in its entirety, reminiscent of the tower of the nearby Bro Church. A portal, originally the choir portal, has been re-used from the earlier Romanesque stone church and now functions as the sacristy portal. The nave and the choir are however Gothic. The church lacks an apse and has a straight eastern wall with three vertical windows. One of the walls is inscribed with runes made by the locals as a sort of permanent record about their right to use a road through part of Fole.

The interior of the church has been decorated with murals, of which fragments remain. The church does however still contain several medieval items. The baptismal font dates from the early 13th century, with the upper part painted over during the 18th century. It contains on the upper part reliefs depicting the flight into Egypt and the apostles, and on the base sculpted heads and beasts. The church also has a triumphal cross from the middle of the 13th century (painted over in the 1840s), and contains several medieval tombstones. Other furnishings are later, including the Neo-Gothic gallery (1870s), one of only a few such pieces on Gotland.

In the vicinity of the church, is a school building from 1858 and a parsonage from 1820.
