= Stöde Church =

Coordinates: 62.4157°N 16.5803°E

- Stöde kyrka
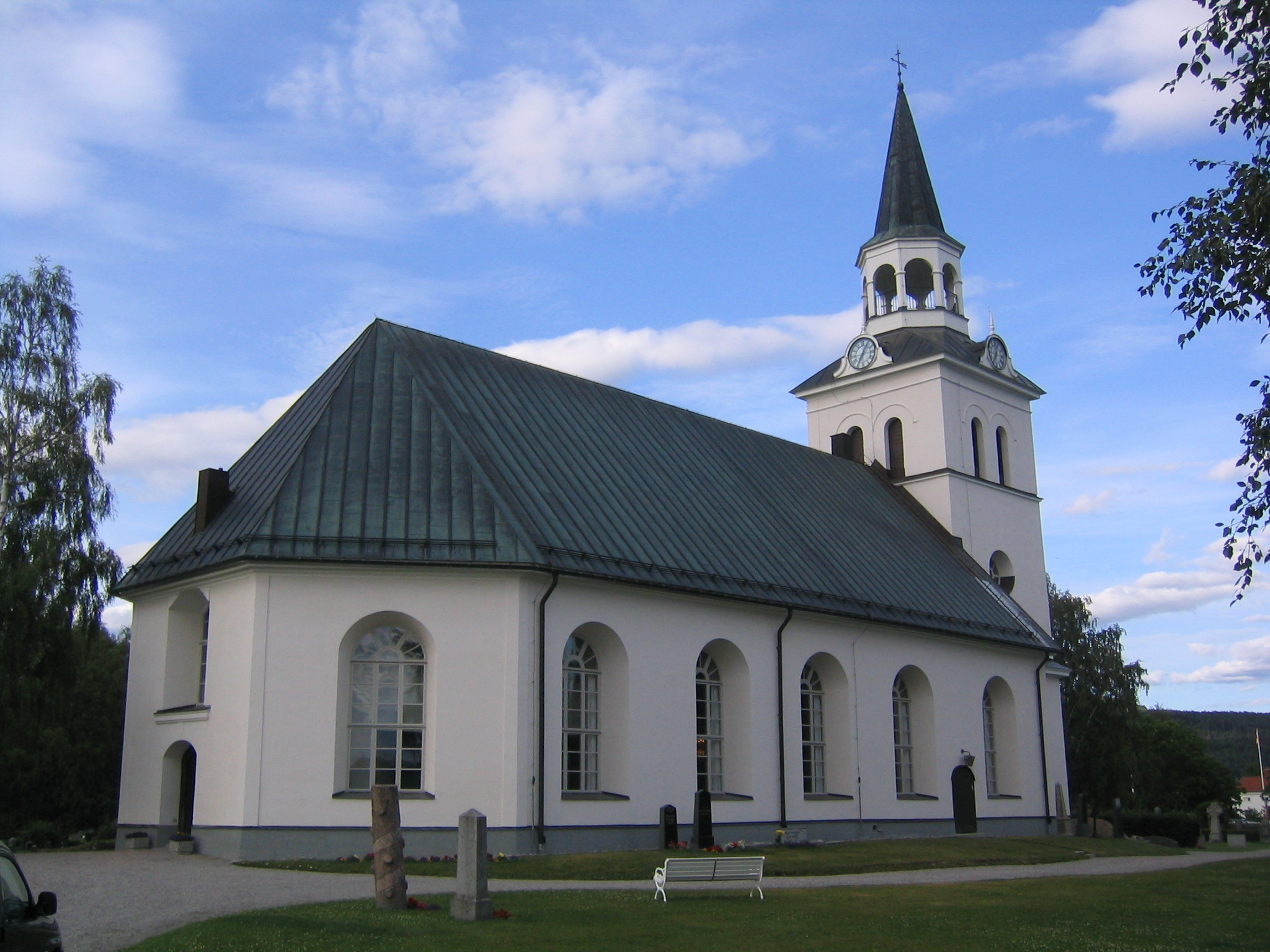
- Stöde Church in July 2006
- Stöde Church
- Location: Stöde
- Country: Sweden
- Denomination: Church of Sweden

History
- Consecrated: 1759; 267 years ago

Administration
- Diocese: Härnösand
- Parish: Stöde

The Stöde Church (Swedish: Stöde kyrka) is a church building in Stöde, Sweden. Belonging to the Stöde Parish of the Church of Sweden, construction begun in 1757 and was completed in 1759.
