= Bulverket =

Bulwark remains in Sweden

- Bulverket (Swedish)
- Bålverket, Tingstäde Bulverk
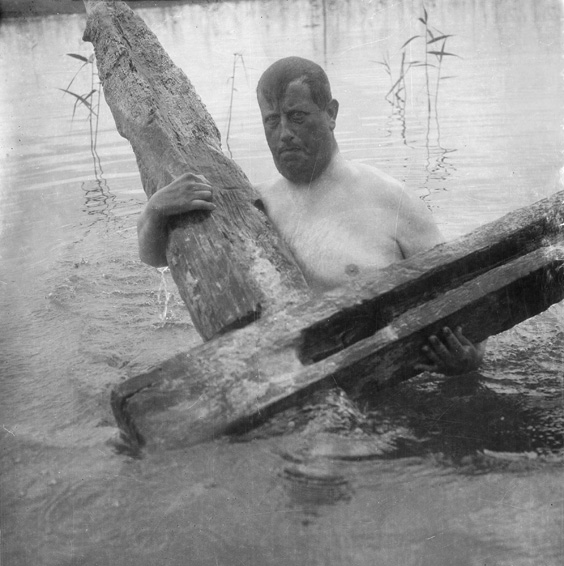
- Geologist Lennart von Post recovering part of the Bulverket in 1927.
- Interactive map of Bulverket
- 57°43′40″N 18°37′43″E
- Type: Lake fortification
- Location: Lake Tingstäde, Gotland, Sweden
- Nearest city: Tingstäde

History
- Original use: Unknown

Site notes
- Elevation: 40 m (130 ft)
- Area: 40,000 square metres (430,000 sq ft)
- Architectural style: Viking wooden construction

The Bulverket is the remnants of a large wooden fortification or bulwark at Lake Tingstäde on the island of Gotland, Sweden. When built, it consisted of a platform with houses surrounded by a double palisade with the entire construction around 250 m (820 ft) in diameter.

According to a 1989 archeological survey, the structure was built in the 1130s and may have been used for less than a century. Although its original purpose is unknown, theories suggest it was either used as a shelter during the turbulent times on Gotland at the end of the Viking Age or that it was the site of a last stand.

Among the archeological finds at the Bulverket are the remains of three boats. One of these served as a model for the reconstruction of a Viking boat, the Krampmacken, in 1980. Krampmacken has subsequently made several journeys following old Viking waterways through Eastern Europe.

== Etymology ==
The name Bulverket originates from the old Swedish words bul, meaning "log", and verk which refers to something "built". It is related to the English word "bulwark", a form of fortification, as well as the Dutch bolwerk with the same meaning and the Swedish bålverk.

== Discovery ==
It is likely that the Bulverket has been known to the local people for centuries, as thousands of logs can be seen through the water on a calm day, and it is also considered the best place for perch fishing on the lake. However, there is no oral lore regarding its construction, purpose, or fate. All that remains is a saying used in the northern part of Gotland that concerns large amounts of smoke: "There is smoke just like when Lake Tingstäde burned".(Swedish: Det ryker som när Tingstäde träsk brann.)

The Bulverket was first mentioned in written sources in 1868, when Swedish archeologist Oscar Montelius wrote that naturalist and teacher Dr. Lindström discovered poles in Lake Tingstäde in 1866.

One of the recommended ways of seeing the Bulverket is during the winter, when the ice is smooth and clear and the lake is used for tour skating.

== Construction ==
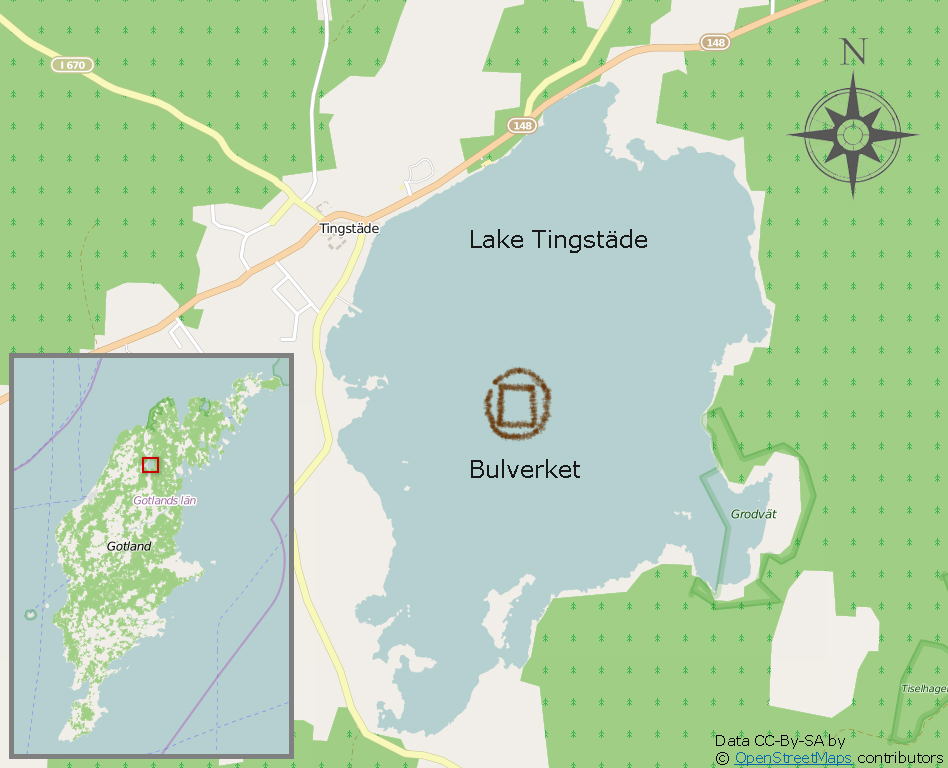
Location and size of the Bulverket in Lake Tingstäde, Gotland

The Bulverket is the remnants of a large wooden fortification or bulwark on the island of Gotland. It was raised in the middle of Lake Tingstäde, in the least accessible part of the lake. It has now collapsed and the logs are scattered over an area of 40,000 square metres (430,000 sq ft). The main part of the Bulverket consisted of four piers on square caissons made of logs. The piers, 30 to 40 m (98 to 131 ft) wide, formed a square platform, each side of which was 170 m (560 ft), with an open, but sheltered, water area in the middle. The platform was aligned so that each side faced one of the cardinal directions. On the platform were houses for people living on the Bulverket as well as storage sheds, and in the central part were landings for mooring boats. It is estimated that about 200 ships of the early Viking Age type could be moored there.

=== Platform and palisade ===
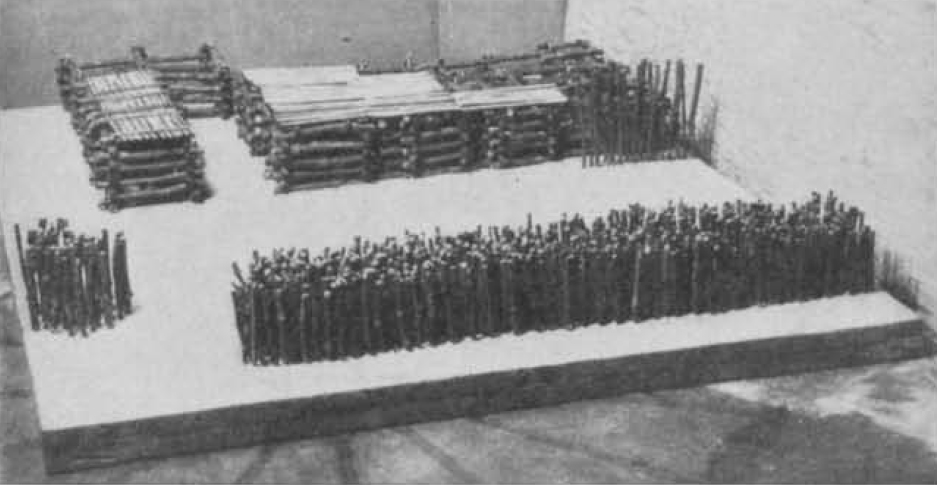
A 1:40 scale model of the north west corner of the Bulverket.

The platform was enclosed by two concentric circles of poles (or timber piles) driven into the bottom of the lake. In some parts, this outer defence stood as far as 50 m (160 ft) from the platform. The entire construction was about 250 m (820 ft) in diameter. The palisade and the platform had openings in the northwest part of the construction to allow boats in and out. Analysis of vertical posts show that the water surface is at approximately the same height when the Bulverket was built as it is today, but that the depth of the water has decreased due to sedimentation. The sedimentation layer is 0.5 to 1 m (1.6 to 3.3 ft) on the site.

The Bulverket was not surveyed and built as a single unit, but rather one caisson at a time. Some of these caissons were linked by making rectangular holes in the ends of the vertical logs, stacking the logs on top of each other and driving a horizontal pole about 20 cm × 10 cm (7.9 in × 3.9 in) through the holes. The caissons were approximately 4 m (13 ft) high and covered with a flooring that rested 1 m (3.3 ft) above the water.

=== Houses ===
The houses were built using different methods such as post-and-plank, log house technique and palisade walls. Construction details found at the site indicates that the houses were approximately 3 m × 3 m (9.8 ft × 9.8 ft). A total of about 25,000 logs, mostly pine, were used to build the Bulverket. This equals approximately 50 ha (120 acres) of forest. Studies of the construction show that it was built in a relatively short period of time, perhaps no less than a year. This would have required about 100 men to work on the site. Given the amount of organization needed for such a project and that the farms around Lake Tingstäde could not spare all of their workers for the construction, most of northern Gotland must have been involved in the work.

== Purpose ==
Although the reason for the construction of the Bulverket is unknown, such a heavily fortified construction in the middle of a large lake suggests a place of refuge. The concept of such a building has no equivalent on Gotland or western Scandinavia, suggesting that it may have been influenced by Slavic or Baltic buildings. Different theories as to why this shelter was needed have been presented. At the beginning of the 12th century, pirates and lesser kings ravaged the Baltic Sea and the fortification may have been used as the site of a last stand in one of these battles. Many finds at the site indicate fishing and trade, and one theory is that it was a central trading and storage hub. Opposition to this theory points out that the fortification is too heavy for a simple trading post. During the time of the Bulverket, Gotland came under pressure from representatives of the new Christian religion, which climaxed with the island coming under the dominion of the diocese of Linköping. One theory is that it was built to make a stand against this tide of religious colonisation. Yet another theory has to do with the social upheaval that took place on Gotland at the end of the Viking Age. This was not a peaceful time, and Tingstäde was just as strategic then as it has been until the beginning of the 1900s. The chieftains on Gotland were at war and a shelter may have been needed by those avoiding the conflict. As of 2015, none of the theories have so far been confirmed.

== Archeological surveys ==
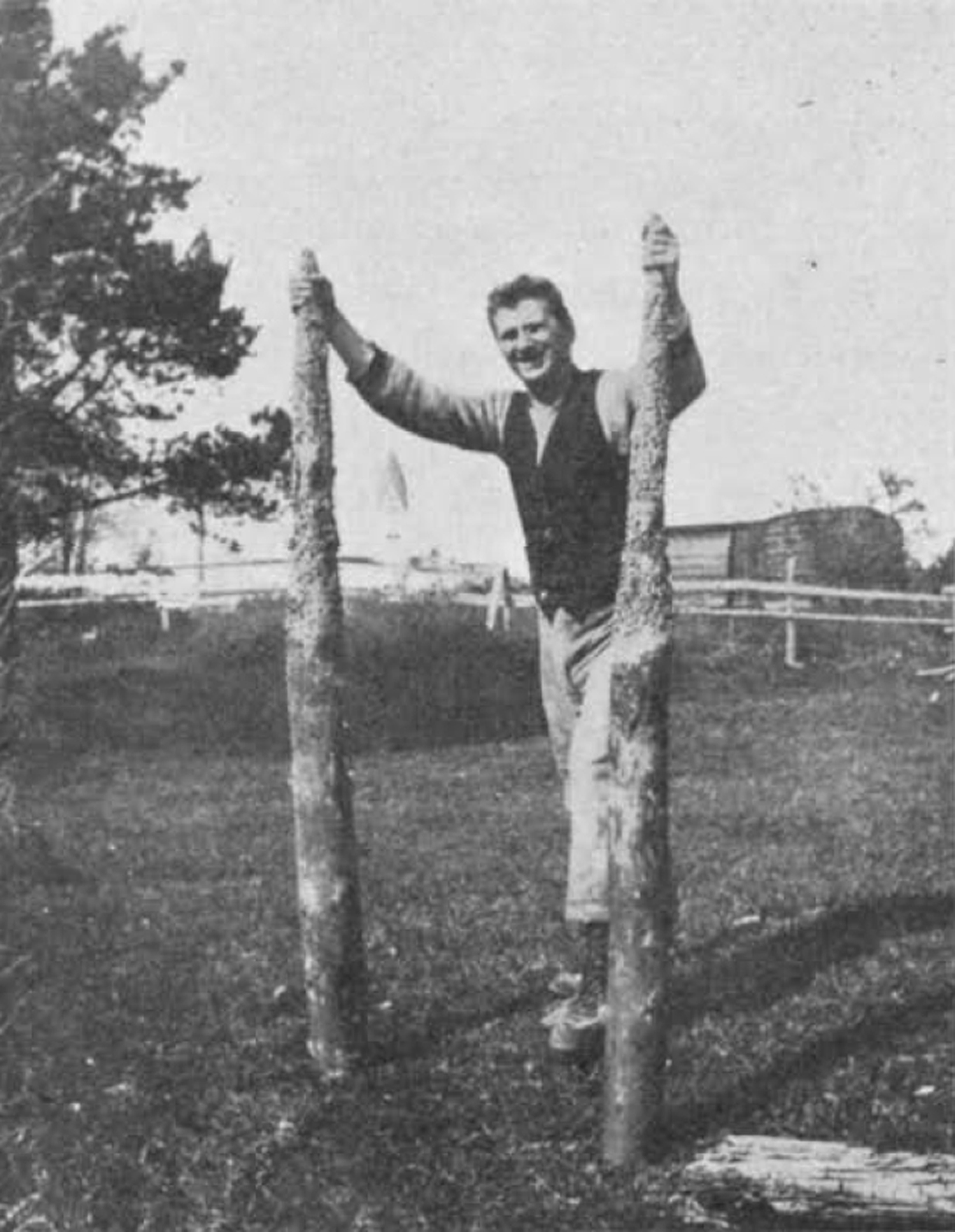
Two poles from the palisade retrieved during the 1923 survey

Because of Lake Tingstäde's natural sedimentation the remains of the Bulverket are well preserved and the underwater archeological finds from the site are in very good condition. Even small juniper boughs placed on the ice by the carpenters to mark the layout of the Bulverket during its construction have been preserved. It is likely that the logs and timbers were cut during the winter and transported on the ice to the Bulverket.

=== 1921–1936 ===
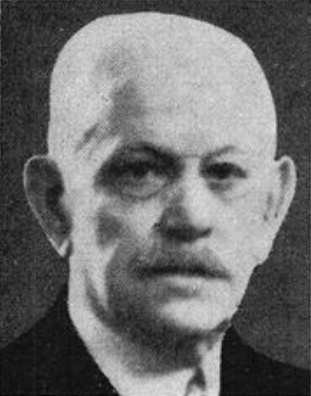
Arvid Zetterling

Arvid Zetterling, born in Åtvidaberg on 29 May 1865, was a Captain with the Gotland Artillery Regiment who saw the Bulverket when he went fishing on Lake Tingstäde. He became fascinated by the logs he saw on the bottom of the lake and made a small survey of the Bulverket in 1915. However, it was not until he retired and became a Major in the reserve in 1918 that he could undertake a more thorough examination of the structure. The first real archeological survey started in 1921, despite the fact that Zetterling lived in Hässleholm at that time. He retired completely from the military in 1932, to spend most of his time studying the Bulverket. In 1932–35, he rented lodgings at Furubjär Farm in Tingstäde, where he also founded a museum dedicated to the Bulverket. The museum closed when he died on 18 January 1939.

Zetterling was an amateur archeologist with limited resources. He dredged the site using homemade tools, drew large parts of the Bulverket sitting on a tall chair, resembling that of a tennis umpire's, in the lake and through contacts had aerial photos taken of the site. Zetterling was probably the first in Sweden to use aerial photography in archeology. During the dredging, he found mostly different types of timber from the platform and houses, among these a wooden chest about 1 metre (3.3 ft) long made from a log, a 4.5 by 0.3 metres (14.76 ft × 0.98 ft) watering trough, a 5-metre (16 ft) ladder, the remnants of two kinds of boats as well as some bronze objects, floats, hazelnuts and bones from cattle, sheep, pigs and fowls. He also found some fire-damaged timber and therefore concluded that a large part of the Bulverket had burned down. He compiled a 1:50 scale "Plan of the Bulverket".

=== 1989–1994 ===
The latest surveys of the Bulverket were done in 1989–1994 and led by Johan Rönnby. Among other things, a side-scan sonar was used to map the bottom of the lake. Stratigraphic surveys were made of an area of 27 by 2.5 m (88.6 by 8.2 ft) in the south part of the site and 20 core samples were taken in different parts of the site. No dark earth was found, indicating that the construction was not used as a habitation for long. Neither were any traces of fire found, suggesting that if there was a fire, it must have been a relatively small one that did not destroy the entire Bulverket. An alternative hypothesis suggests that the construction became unstable and was abandoned before it finally collapsed.

Dendrochronological and Carbon-14 examinations shows that the Bulverket was built in the 1130s, and archeologists are as of 2015 trying to ascertain how long it was in use. The current estimates are a few years up to a century.

== Bulverket boat ==
During the survey in the 1920s, components of three different boats were found at the Bulverket. Additional pieces of the largest of these came to light in the 1990 investigation. A total of 29 pieces of the boat were found, (Note: 35 pieces according to Cederlund.) but since many vital parts of it were missing, it is not possible to determine the vessel's exact measurements. It is estimated that the boat was approximately 8 metres (26 ft) long, (Note: 10 metres (33 ft) according to Rönnby in November 1999.) 2 metres (6.6 ft) wide and had a draft of 0.8 metres (2.6 ft). It was clinker built, double-ended with a mast, probably with a square rig and side rudder. The construction of the boat was a common Viking style, the same design used for the longships and was probably used for fishing and the day-to-day activities on the lake.

The boat had a T-shaped keel, probably seven frames and six strakes joined with wooden pegs. This and the positioning of the mast in a hole in one of the frames, suggests influences from Slavic boatbuilding techniques. It is built in the tradition going back to the Hjortspring boat (400-300 BC) and is compared to the boats from Danzig-Ohra 2, Skuldelev 6 and Valsgärde 2.

Carbon-14 dating of the boat was carried out in 1975 by the laboratory at the Swedish Museum of Natural History, which dated it to around 1200. This posed a problem since the boat would have been used by the inhabitants of the fortification, but the rest of the Bulverket was dated to the 1130s. It was later explained that the remnants of the boat were treated with linseed oil and alum in the 1930s, as part of the conservation process, and this may have distorted the results. Further examination of the wood showed that the boats were made of pine. The pieces of the boat were kept in the Swedish History Museum until 1975, when they were moved to the Maritime Museum for complete documentation.

=== Krampmacken ===
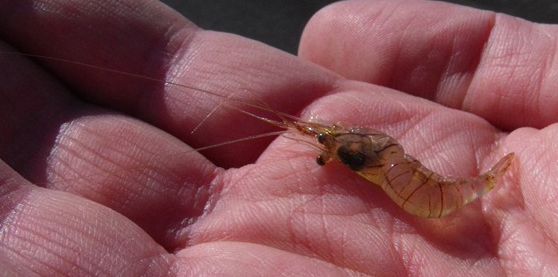
A "krampmack" (Palaemon adspersus)

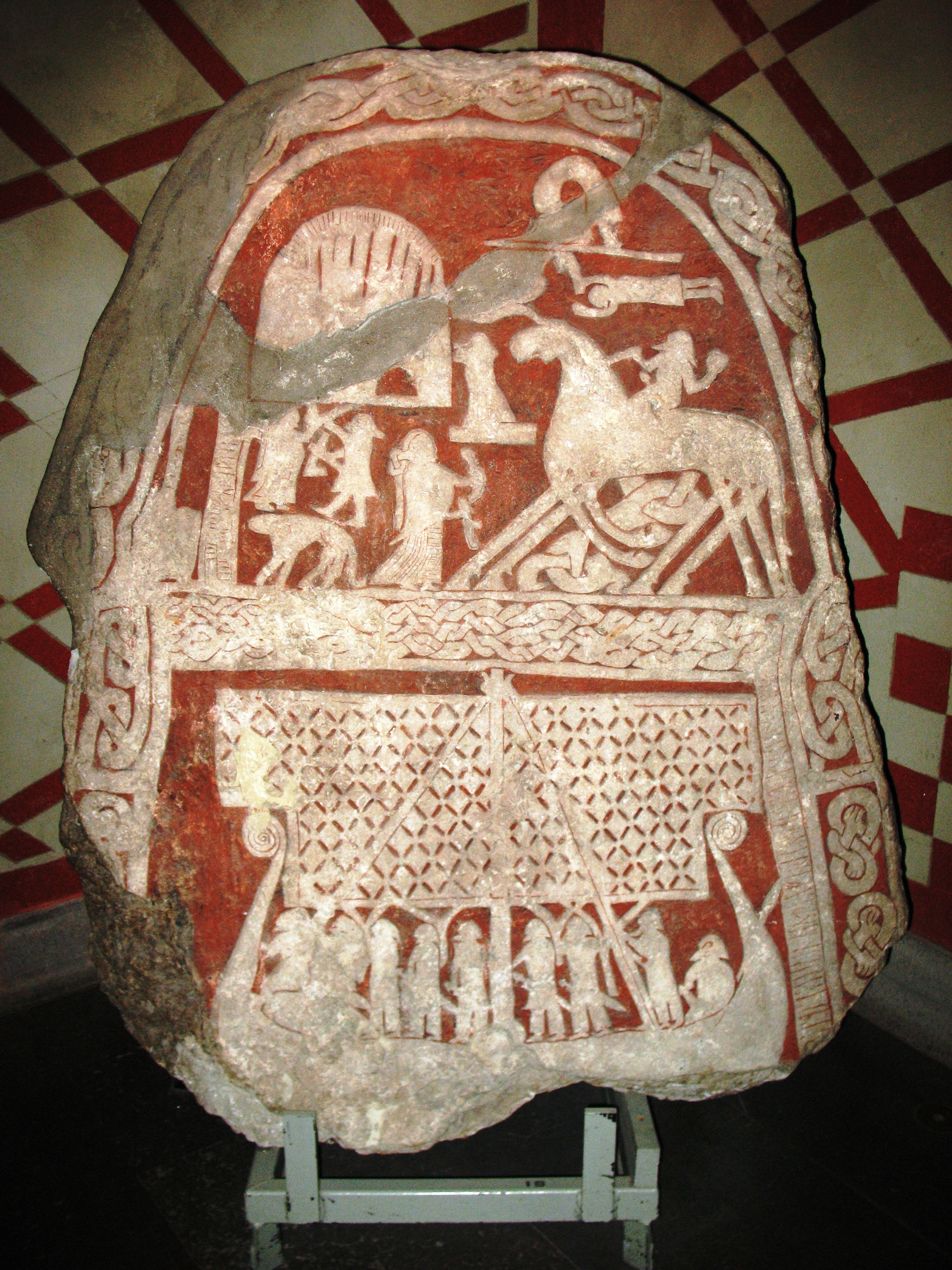
Picture stone from Tjängvide, Gotland. One of the stones depicting a square sail of the kind used on Krampmacken.

In 1979–80, the Krampmacken, a reconstruction of a Viking boat, was built based on the Bulverket boat. One of the initiators of the project was archeologist and director of the Gotlandic department of Swedish National Heritage Board (RAGU), Erik Nylén. It was named after the Gutnish word for the common Baltic shrimp, Palaemon adspersus: "krampmack", since the shape of the boat resembled a small shrimp.

The boat is 8 by 2 metres (26.2 ft × 6.6 ft), has six oars and is manned by a crew of eleven people. While the hull is based on the Bulverket boat, the sail is patterned after sails depicted on Gotlandic picture stones. Krampmacken has in turn been used a model for other reconstructed Viking ships such as Nöiriven (1990), Aifur (1992), Thor Viking (1994) and Langsvaige (1997).

In 1983–85, the Krampmacken sailed from Gotland, via the Vistula and Danube rivers to the Black Sea and Istanbul, which was called Micklagård by the Swedish Vikings. In 1995–97, a journey was made following the Caucasus rivers all the way to Baku on the Caspian Sea. Following these expeditions, several other reconstructed Viking ships have made journeys on the rivers of Eastern Europe.
