= Martebo =

District on Gotland, Sweden

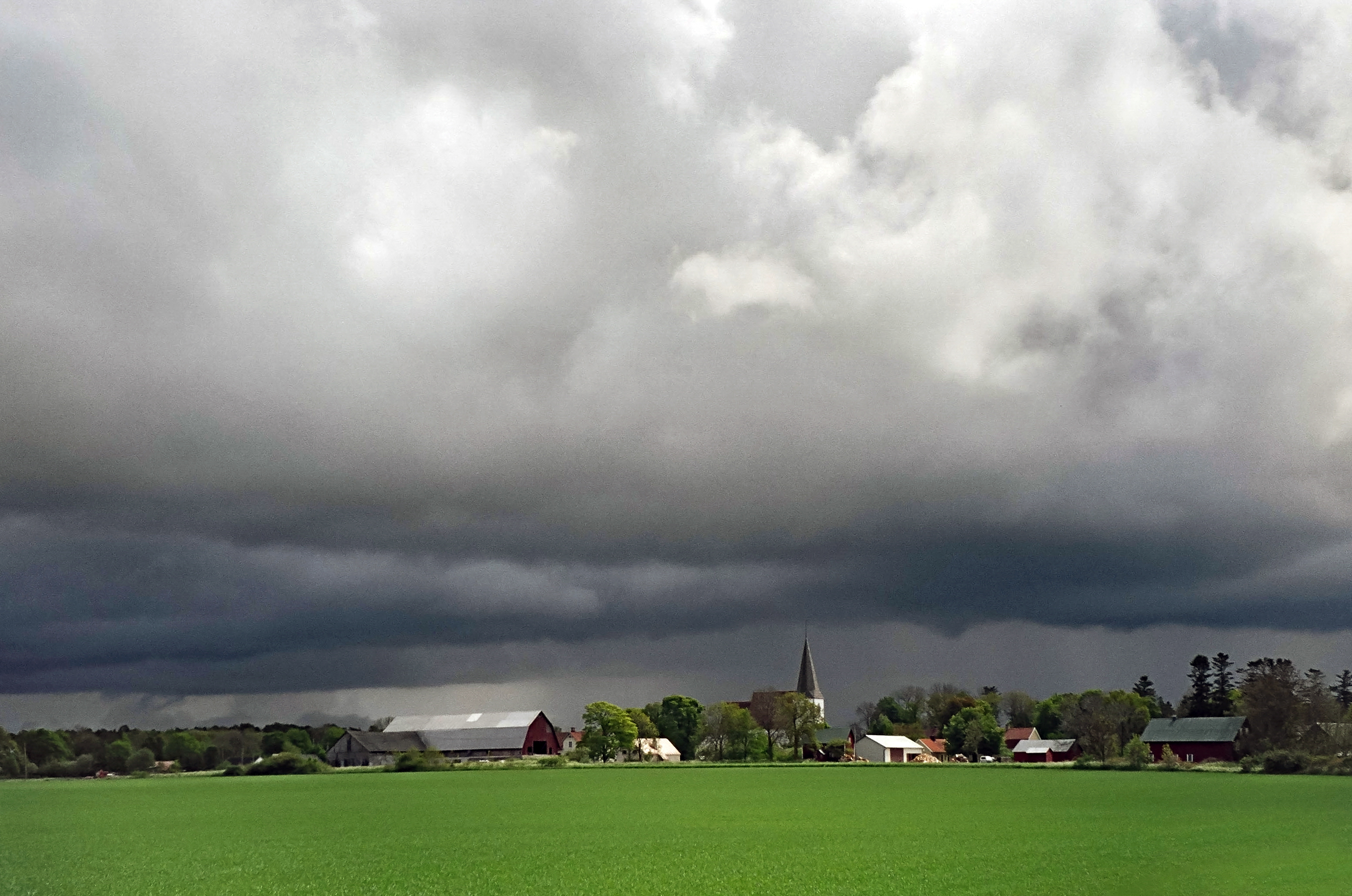
- Martebo

- Location within Gotland
- Coordinates: 57°44′55″N 18°29′31″E
- Country: Sweden
- Province: Gotland
- County: Gotland County
- Municipality: Gotland Municipality

Area
  - Total: 27 km^{2} (10 sq mi)

Population (2014)
  - Total: 174
- Time zone: UTC+1 (CET)
  - Summer (DST): UTC+2 (CEST)

Martebo (Swedish pronunciation: [ˈmâʈːɛˌbuː]) is a populated area, a socken (not to be confused with parish), on the Swedish island of Gotland. It comprises the same area as the administrative Martebo District, established on 1 January 2016. As of 2020, the total population of Martebo is 150.

== Geography ==
Martebo is the name of the socken as well as the district. It is also the name of the small village surrounding the medieval Martebo Church, sometimes referred to as Martebo kyrkby. It is situated in the northwest part of Gotland. The area is mainly farmed land, some of it on part of a drained mire. This is where the noted Martebo lights can be seen.

As of 2019, Martebo Church belongs to Stenkyrka parish in Norra Gotlands pastorat, along with the churches in Stenkyrka, Tingstäde and Lummelunda.

One of the asteroids in the Asteroid belt, 3250 Martebo, is named after this place.
