= Tingstäde Church =

- Tingstäde kyrka
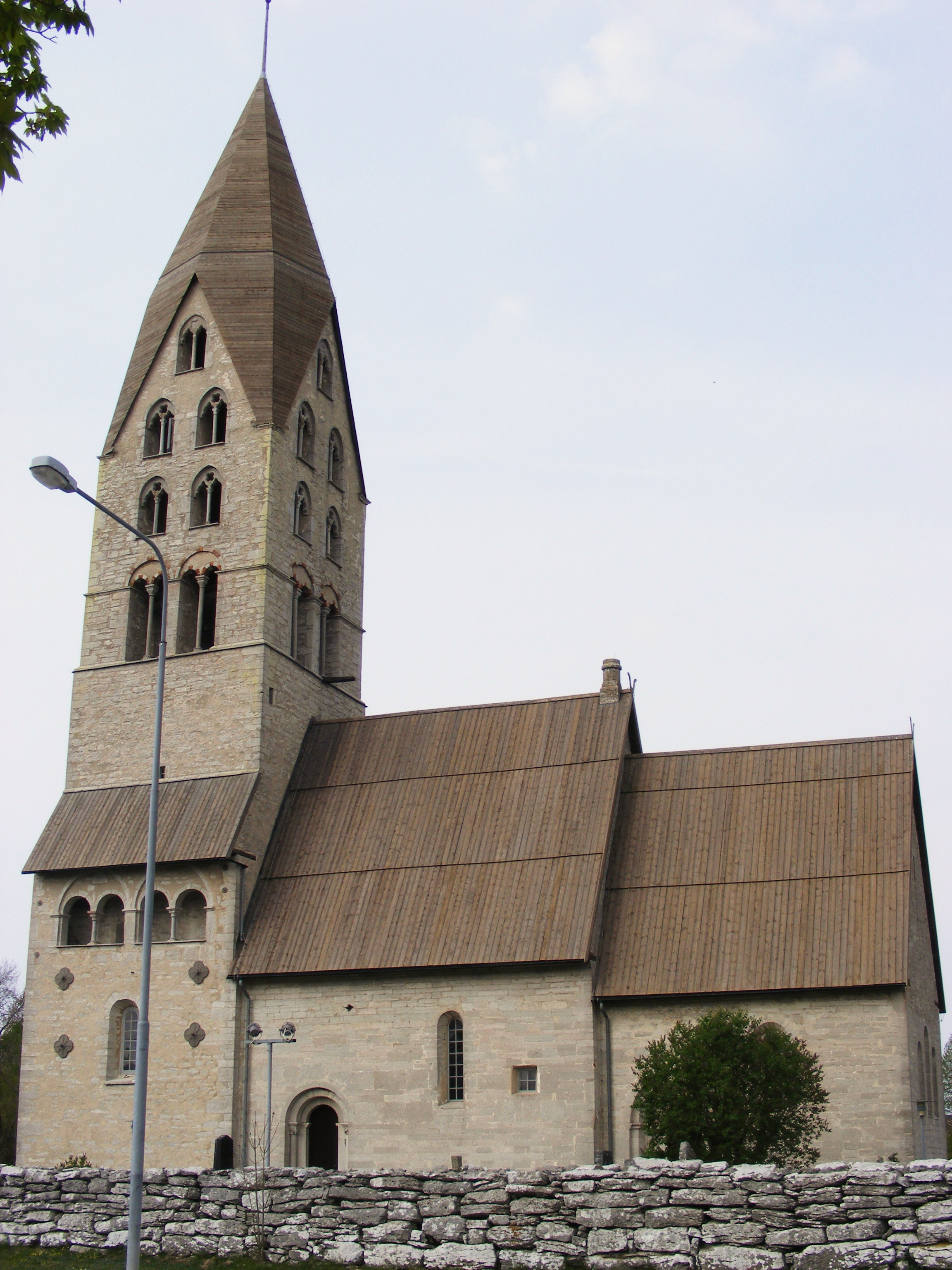
- Tingstäde Church

- Location on Gotland
- 57°44′11″N 18°36′54″E
- Country: Sweden
- Denomination: Church of Sweden

Administration
- Diocese: Visby

Tingstäde Church (Swedish: Tingstäde kyrka) is a medieval church on the Swedish island of Gotland, in the Diocese of Visby. Its present appearance dates largely from the 13th and 14th centuries.

== History ==
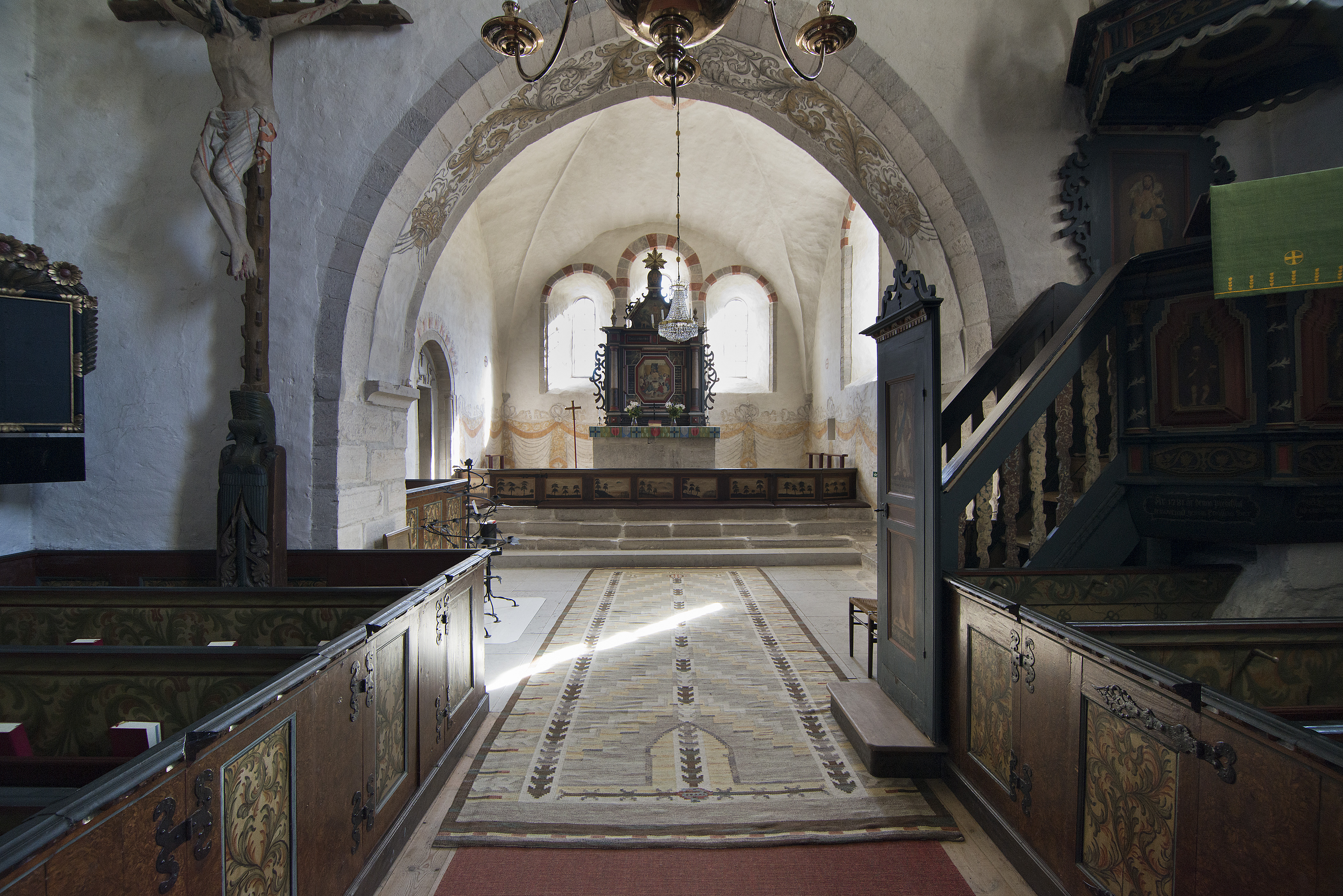
Interior view towards the choir

A wooden church was built on the site of the current one during the early 12th century, at the latest. The church has later been replaced by first a Romanesque church, of which the portals survive, and later once more rebuilt in Gothic style during the 13th and 14th centuries. Few alterations have been made to the church since.

The church was one of three so-called asylum churches on Gotland during the Middle Ages, a place where suspected criminals could find refuge awaiting trial. The name Tingstäde also translates to "location of a thing", indicating that the place has ancient judicial traditions.

== Architecture ==
The church has a high (55 metres (180 ft)) tower, adorned with Gothic galleries on several storeys. Inside, remains of picture stones have been used as building material. The nave is vaulted and the ceiling supported by a single, central column with richly sculpted capitals, a work by an anonymous master sculptor sometimes referred to as Calcarius during the 13th century. The choir lacks an apse. Externally, the Romanesque portals are also decorated with stone sculptures. Another portal, inside the choir and leading to the vestry, is even older, dating from the 12th century and decorated with the Lamb of God, which is also the heraldic symbol of Gotland. Given the location of the church at an ancient political site, this has led some scholars to speculate whether it was already a symbol for the island during the 12th century.

Tingstäde Church has a baptismal font probably made by the artist known by the notname Majestatis, possibly a remnant of the first, wooden church. The church also has a noteworthy triumphal cross from the 14th century. The altarpiece is from a considerably later period, dating from the 18th century, while the pews are probably from the 17th century.
