= List of churches in Uppland =

This is a list of churches in the Swedish province of Uppland. The list does not include chapels or church ruins. Churches in Stockholm municipality are listed in a separate list.

Note: in the list, "Year" denotes the year construction of the church was finished, when it was inaugurated, or the main construction period of the church.

== The list ==
Name	Year	Coordinates	Image	Notes	Refs
Adelsö Church	late 12th century	59°21′36″N 17°31′53″E			
Almunge Church	c. 1250 – 1350	59°51′59″N 18°04′06″E			
Alsike Church	13th century	59°43′58″N 17°41′12″E			
Altuna Church	1850	59°49′09″N 16°55′53″E			
Alunda Church	13th century	60°03′36″N 18°04′05″E			
Angarn Church	late 13th century	59°32′12″N 18°10′07″E			
Arholma Church	1928	59°50′45″N 19°06′37″E			
Arnö Church	13th century	59°29′55″N 17°10′43″E			
Bälinge Church	13th century	59°56′45″N 17°31′46″E			
Balingsta Church	12th century	59°45′49″N 17°25′31″E			
Biskopskulla Church	Probably 12th century	59°43′55″N 17°11′51″E			
Björklinge Church	late 13th century	60°01′37″N 17°33′07″E			
Bladåker Church	late 15th century	60°00′00″N 18°15′27″E			
Blidö Church	1850s	59°36′53″N 18°53′20″E			
Boglösa Church	13th century	59°35′46″N 17°10′39″E			
Bred Church	1836-1837	59°40′54″N 16°50′55″E		Designed by architect Fredrik Blom	
Brevik Church	1937	59°20′59″N 18°12′22″E			
Bro Church	c. 1170-1199	59°30′21″N 17°37′36″E			
Börje Church	c. 1300	59°53′02″N 17°30′00″E			
Dalby Church	13th century	59°45′35″N 17°34′23″E			
Danderyd Church	c. 1400	59°24′26″N 18°02′12″E			
Danmark Church	1291	59°46′58″N 17°44′42″E			
Dannemora Church	15th century	60°11′02″N 17°48′50″E			
Djurö Church	1683	59°18′18″N 18°41′21″E			
Drottningholm Palace Church	1730	59°19′20″N 17°53′10″E		Part of Drottningholm Palace; designed by Carl Hårleman	
Duvbo Church	1904	59°20′04″N 18°01′25″E			
Ed Church	late 12th century	59°30′28″N 17°52′05″E			
Edebo Church	c. 1489	60°00′28″N 18°34′38″E			
Edsbro Church	13th century	59°53′40″N 18°29′36″E			
Ekeby Church	late 13th century	60°05′06″N 18°13′25″E			
Ekerö Church	late 12th century	59°16′20″N 17°44′53″E			
Enköpings-Näs Church	c. 1100	59°33′37″N 17°00′36″E			
Enåker Church	14th century	60°02′06″N 16°47′59″E			
Estuna Church	13th century	59°49′05″N 18°39′08″E			
Faringe Church	c. 1500	59°58′53″N 18°10′12″E			
Fasterna Church	1797	59°46′10″N 18°14′27″E		Designed by architects Johan Neosander and Olof Tempelman	
Films Church	late 15th century	60°13′45″N 17°53′45″E			
Fittja Church	13th century	59°43′15″N 17°25′46″E			
Forsmark Church	1800	60°22′19″N 18°09′34″E		Designed by architects Olof Tempelman and Louis Masreliez	
Fresta Church	13th century	59°31′04″N 17°57′24″E			
Fröslunda Church	15th century	59°43′15″N 17°16′07″E			
Frösthult Church	c. 1300	59°44′19″N 16°57′07″E			
Frösunda Church	early 15th century	59°37′19″N 18°10′04″E			
Frötuna Church	late 12th century	59°44′29″N 18°40′30″E			
Funbo Church	late 12th century	59°51′21″N 17°51′19″E			
Färentuna Church	12th century	59°23′29″N 17°39′19″E			
Gamla Uppsala Church	12th century	59°53′58″N 17°37′54″E			
Gottröra Church	12th century	59°44′25″N 18°09′29″E			
Harg Church	15th century	60°11′14″N 18°23′29″E			
Härkeberga Church	c. 1300	59°41′34″N 17°11′16″E		Contains some of the best preserved frescos by Albertus Pictor	
Häverö Church	c. 1300	60°02′28″N 18°40′48″E			
Hilleshög Church	12th century	59°23′27″N 17°42′09″E			
Holy Trinity Church/Bondkyrkan	14th century	59°51′24.8″N 17°37′57.4″E			
Husby-Sjuhundra Church	12th century	59°44′25″N 18°31′48″E			
Järlåsa Church	Inaugurated 1688	59°54′33″N 17°12′47″E			
Jumkil Church	14th century	59°56′33″N 17°25′24″E			
Länna Church	12th century	59°41′00″N 18°36′30″E			
Litslena Church	12th century	59°39′48″N 17°16′02″E			
Lohärad Church	13th century	59°48′25″N 18°33′34″E			
Markim Church	c. 1213	59°36′19″N 18°03′00″E			
Munsö Church	12th century	59°24′05″N 17°33′37″E			
Närtuna Church	12th century	59°41′35″N 18°09′05″E			
Rasbo Church	13th century	59°56′58″N 17°52′46″E			
Rasbokil Church	circa 1500	59°59′34″N 17°51′37″E			
Riala Church	13th century	59°37′51″N 18°31′11″E			
Roslags-Bro Church	middle of the 13th century	59°49′47″N 18°44′13″E			
Rö Church	13th century	59°41′48″N 18°23′20″E			
Salabacke Church	1958	59°52′7.9″N 17°40′5.45″E			
Sånga Church	late 12th century	59°21′29″N 17°42′27″E			
Singö Church	1753	60°09′41″N 18°44′32″E			
Skederid Church	late 13th century	59°44′29″N 18°40′30″E			
Skepptuna Church	13th century	59°42′32″N 18°05′35″E			
Skånela Church	1160s	59°34′52″N 17°56′56″E			
Söderby-Karl Church	14th century	59°53′03″N 18°42′02″E			
Solna Church	late 12th century	59°21′11″N 18°01′26″E			
Stavby Church	Mid-13th century	60°00′36″N 17°57′59″E			
Sundbyberg Church	1911	59°21′51″N 17°58′22″E			
Täby Church	second half of the 13th century	59°29′27″N 18°03′24″E			
Tensta Church	13th century	60°02′26″N 17°40′18″E		Contains the first deliberate portrait in Swedish art	
Tuna Church	late 13th century	60°01′11″N 18°03′52″E			
Ununge Church	13th century	59°55′42″N 18°55′10″E			
Uppsala Cathedral	Inaugurated 1435	59°51′29″N 17°38′00″E		Seat of the Archbishop of Uppsala	
Vaksala Church	12th century	59°52′33″N 17°41′11″E			
Valö Church	13th century?	60°17′26″N 18°07′08″E			
Västeråker Church	1331	59°45′09″N 17°30′38″E			
Vätö Church	14th century	59°40′00″N 18°55′02″E			
Veckholm Church	13th century	59°31′17″N 17°19′24″E			
Viksta Church	1280s	60°04′38″N 17°38′21″E			
Yttergran Church	second half of the 12th century	59°36′05″N 17°30′17″E			
Årsta Church	1974	59°51′57.6″N 17°41′8.1″E			
