= Börje Church =

Church in Uppsala Municipality, Sweden

Coordinates: 59°30′21″N 17°37′36″E

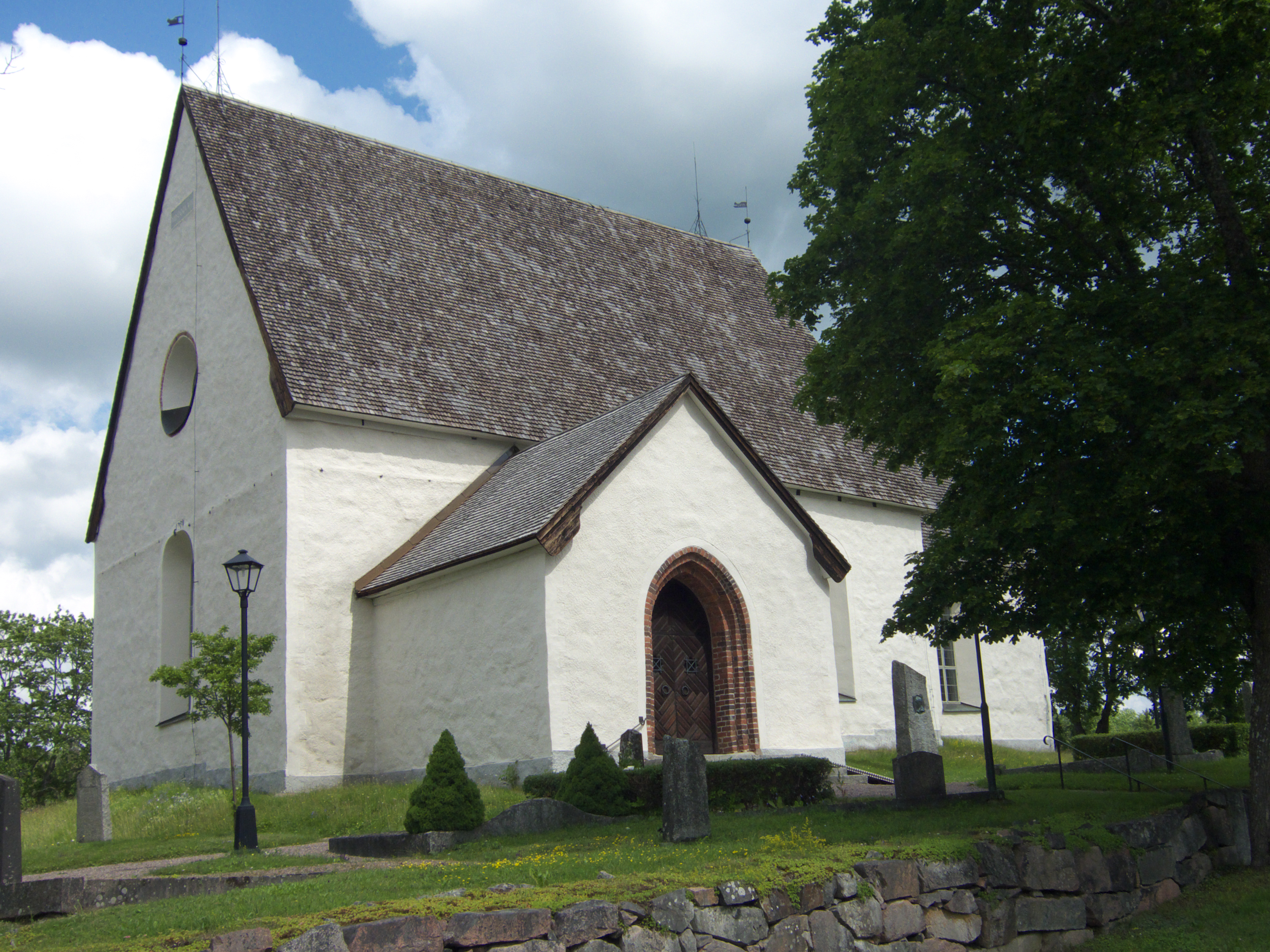
Börje Church, external view

Börje Church (Swedish: Börje kyrka) is a Lutheran church in the Archdiocese of Uppsala in Uppsala County, Sweden, located west of Uppsala.

== History and architecture ==
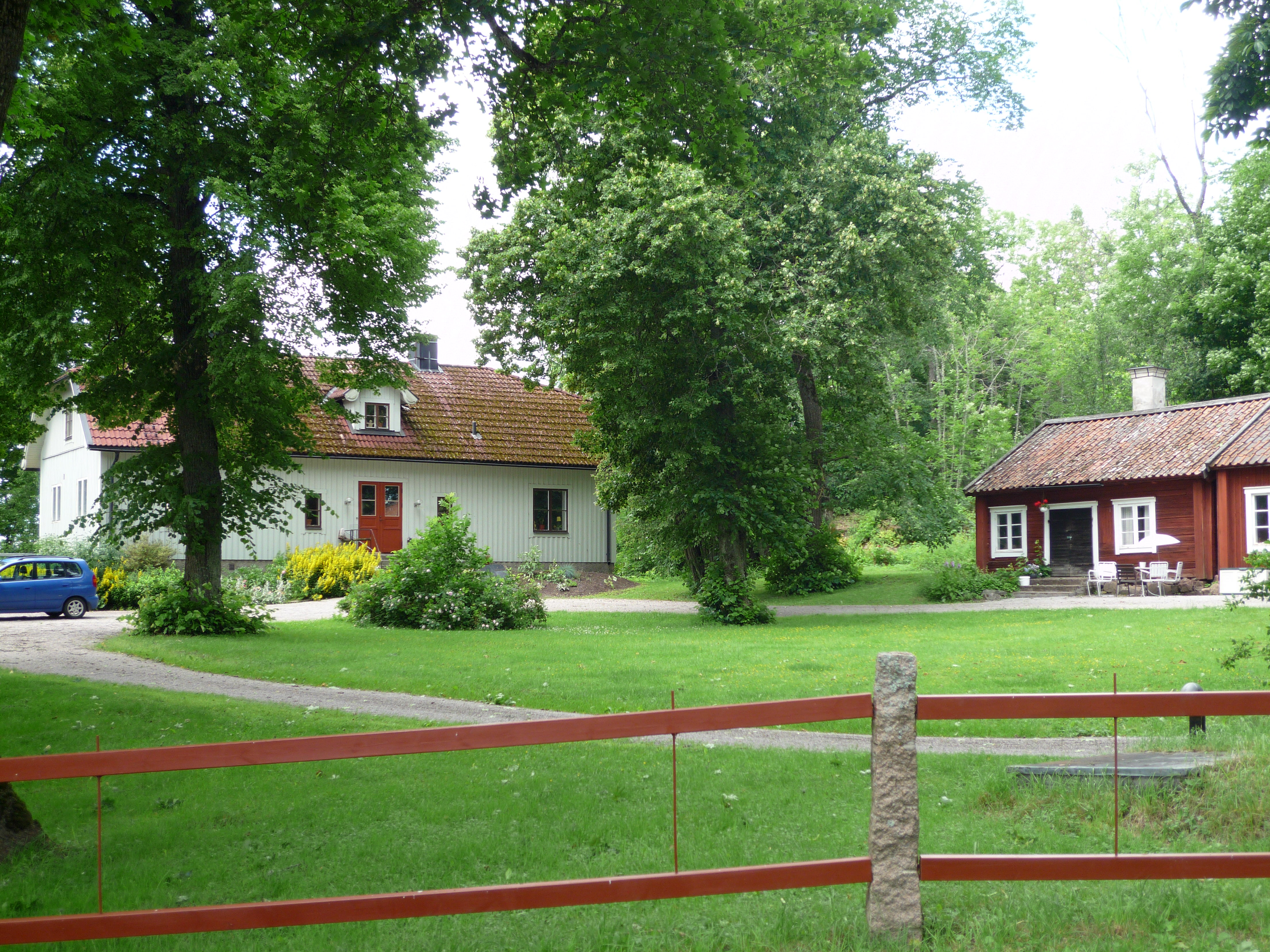
The former parsonage, adjacent to the church

The Christian church at Börje was probably preceded by a Norse religious site, perhaps a spring or a grove. The main parts of presently visible church (nave, choir and sacristy) were probably erected between 1310 and 1360, and built by the local community. The main models for the new church were Uppsala Cathedral and the Holy Trinity Church, also in Uppsala. The church porch was added before the middle of the 15th century. It received internal brick vaulting circa 1430-60. In the 1730s, the church windows were enlarged and the church whitewashed internally. Additional changes were made in 1796-97, and again in 1840-57. Renovations have been carried out in 1911-12, 1951, 1953 and 1959. During the 1953 renovation, medieval frescos were uncovered and restored.

The main construction material of the church is fieldstone, with brick used for the windows and portal openings. The roof is made of shake. Internally, the vaults of the church are decorated with frescos. They date from the late 15th or early 16th century. They belong to a group of church frescos made by the so-called Tierp school; other frescos by this group of artists can be found for example in Roslags-Bro and Sånga Church. The frescos in Börje Church are unusually well preserved.

The church houses a number of noteworthy items. The main altarpiece dates from the 1840s, but preserved in the church is also the original, medieval carved wooden altarpiece of the church. It was made in Uppsala, probably at the end of the 15th century, and depicts the Last Judgement and figures of saints. The baptismal font was made on Gotland and dates from the 13th or 14th century. The church also has a processional cross from the 14th century and a thurible made of bronze, dating from the 13th century. There is also an iron candlestick from the 16th century. The pews and pulpit are later, dating from the 17th century.

There is a runestone immured in the church cemetery wall.

Adjacent to the church lies the well-preserved former parsonage, with a main building erected 1785.
