= Funbo Church =

- Funbo Church
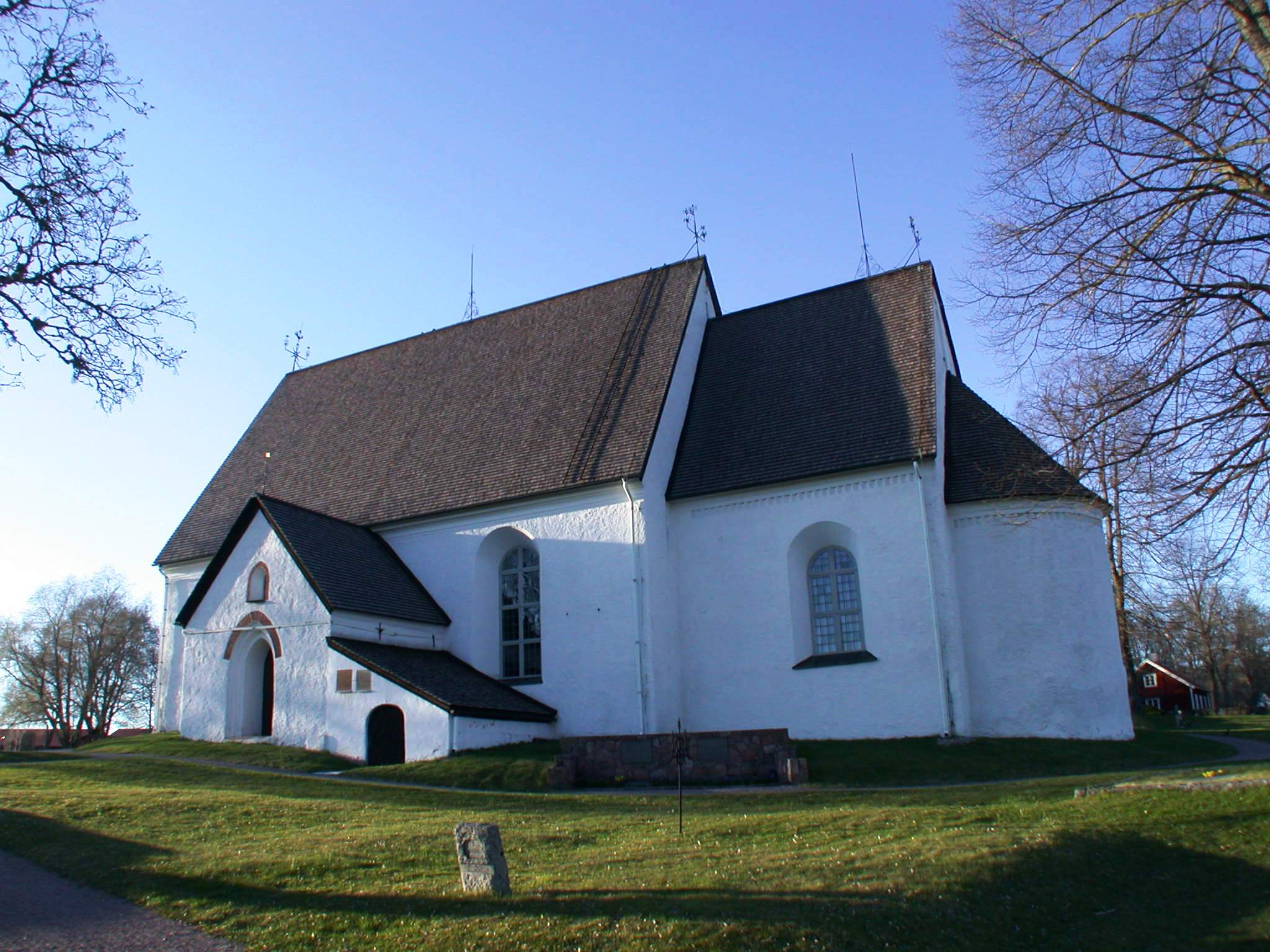
- Funbo Church, April 2007
- Funbo Church
- Location: Funbo, Uppsala County
- Country: Sweden
- Denomination: Church of Sweden
- Previous denomination: Roman Catholic Church

History
- Status: Active
- Consecrated: 12th or 13 th century

Architecture
- Functional status: Parish church

Administration
- Diocese: Archdiocese of Uppsala

The Funbo Church (Swedish: Funbo kyrka) is a medieval church in Funbo village, Uppsala Municipality in Uppsala County Sweden. It is located in the parish of Danmark-Funbo, in the Archdiocese of Uppsala.

== History ==
Funbo is a stone church, built in the late 12th century. The church was built in Romanesque style. In 1301, the church underwent rebuilding in Gothic style. It consists of a rectangular nave, a narrow choir and an apse. The sacristy and the porch were added in the 15th century. The porch was used as the main entrance until 1745, when the current entrance in the western wall was built. The bell tower was erected in 1675. The church interior includes some notable items, such as a 13th-century baptismal font and a 16th-century polyptych, manufactured in northern Germany. The altar was inaugurated on 5 December 1301. The last restoration of the church took place in 2004 under the direction of architect Uno Söderberg.

== Gallery ==
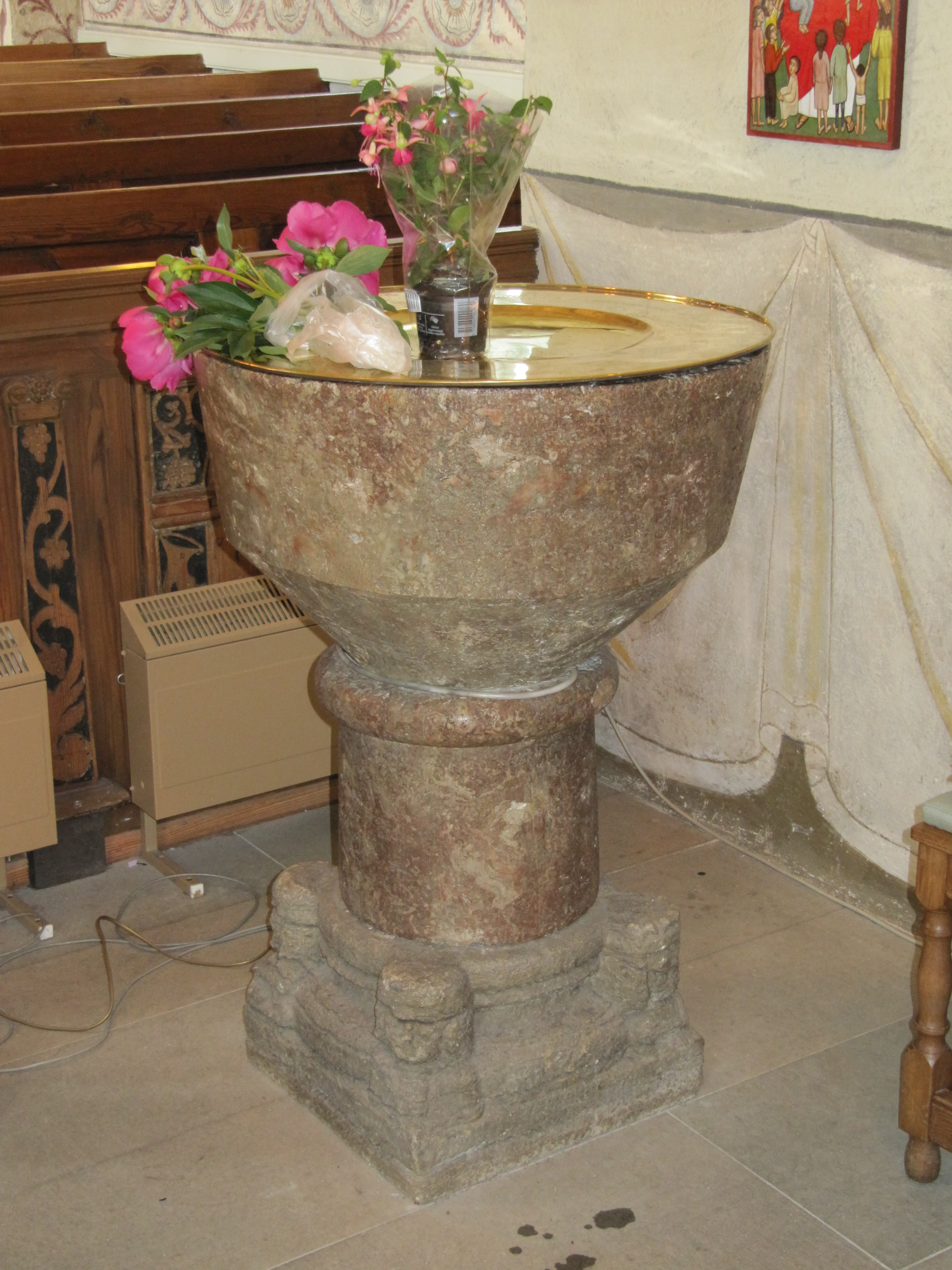

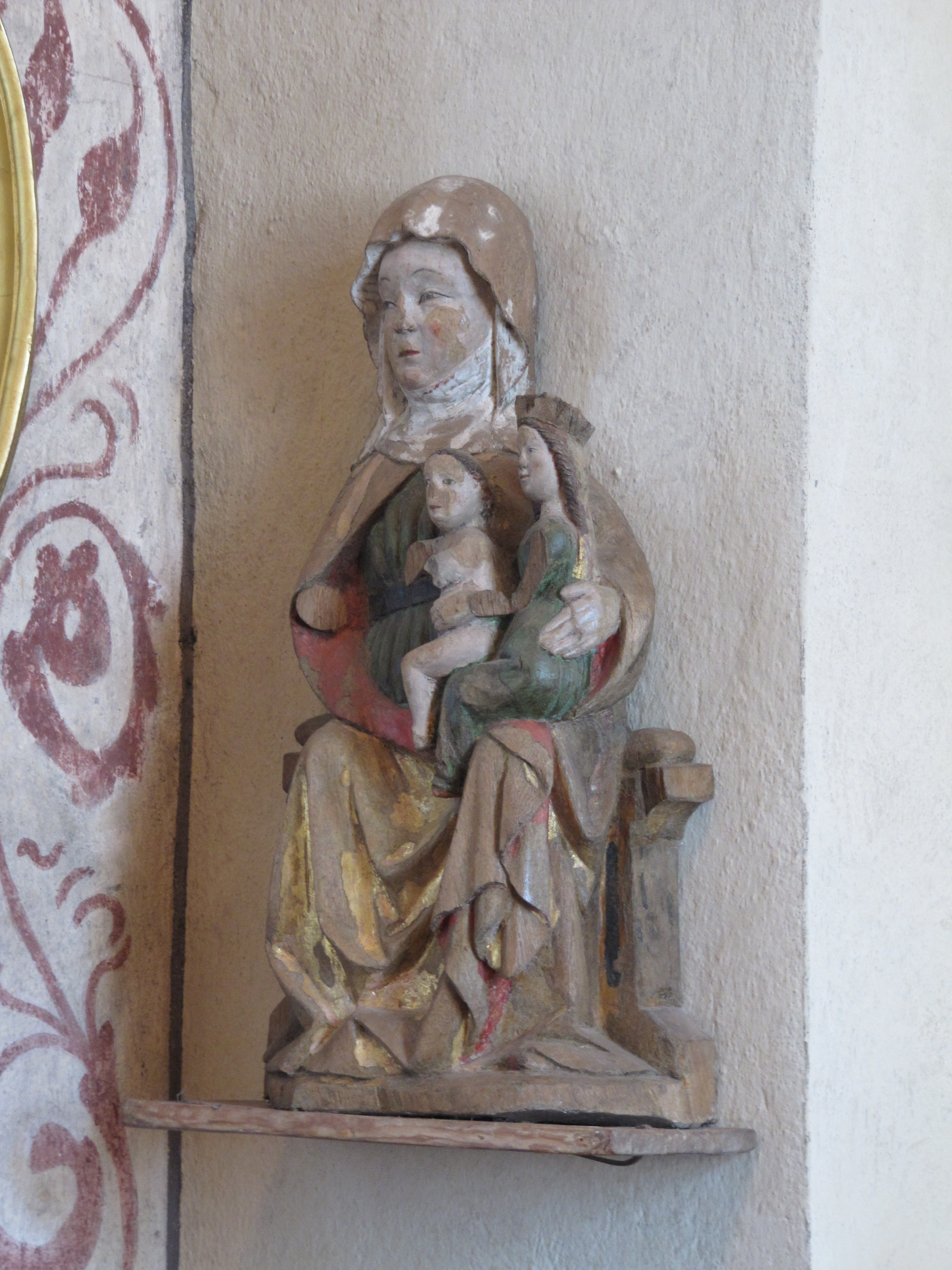

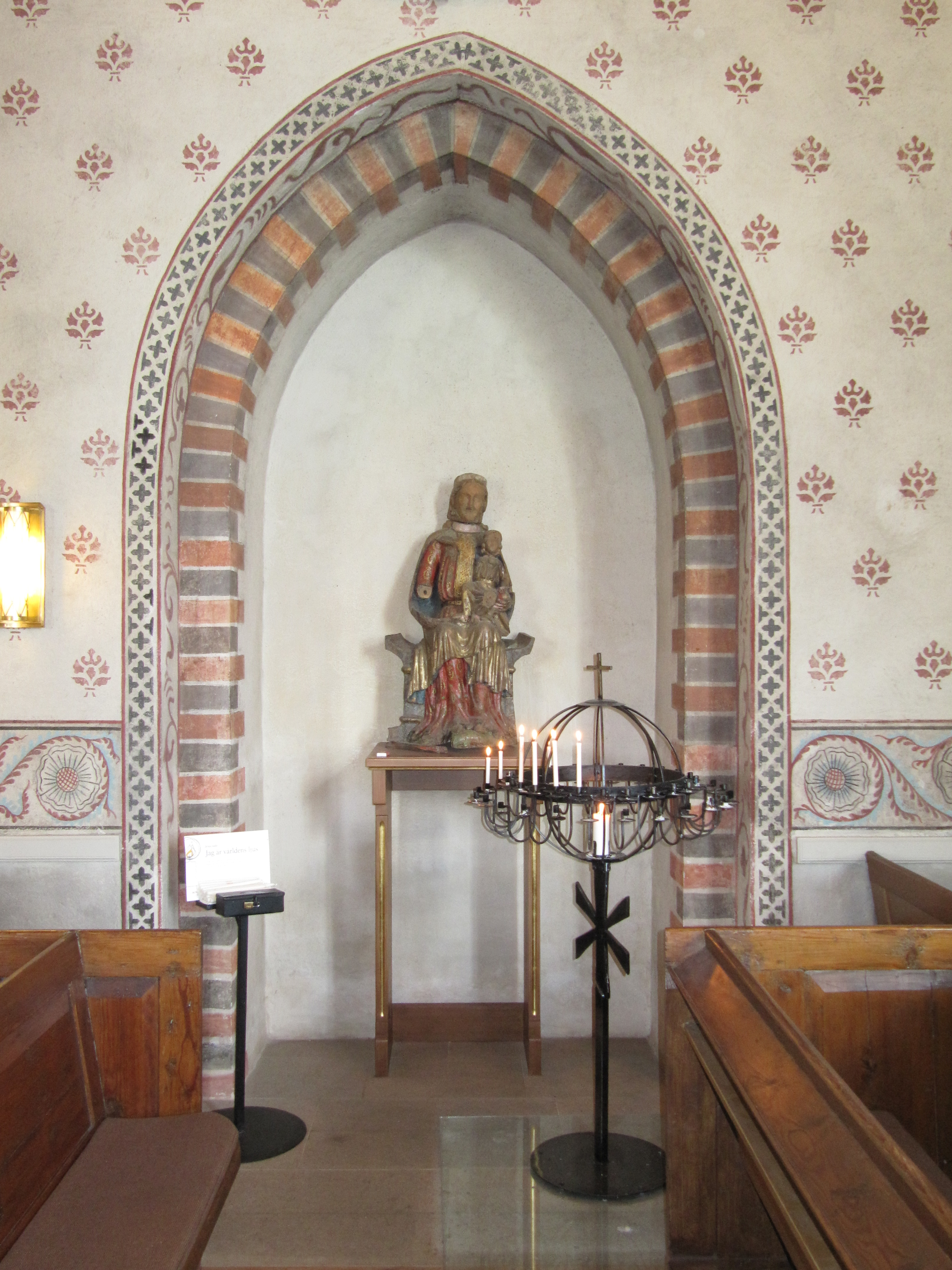

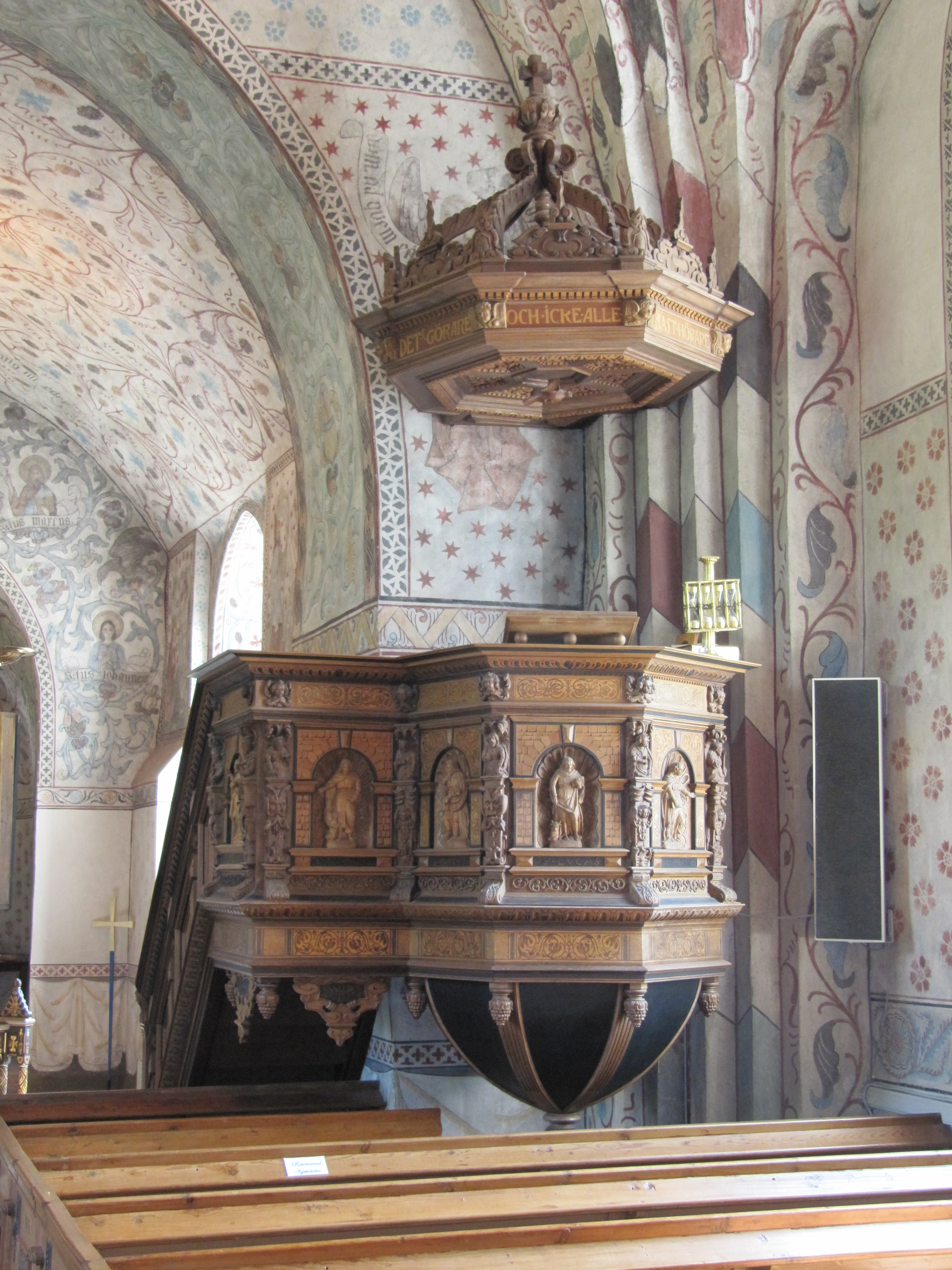

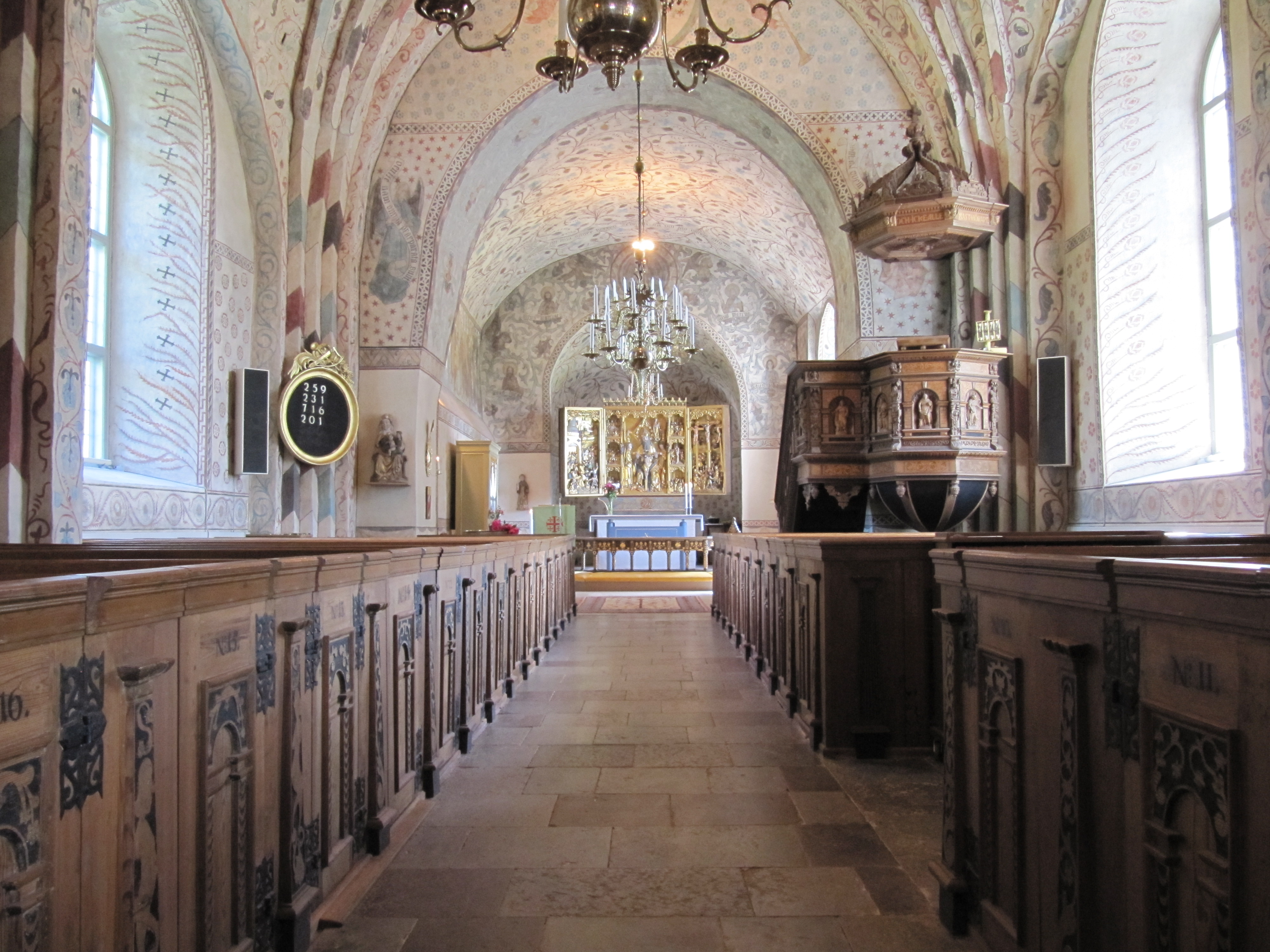
