= Ekeby Church, Uppland =

Coordinates: 60°05′06″N 18°13′25″E

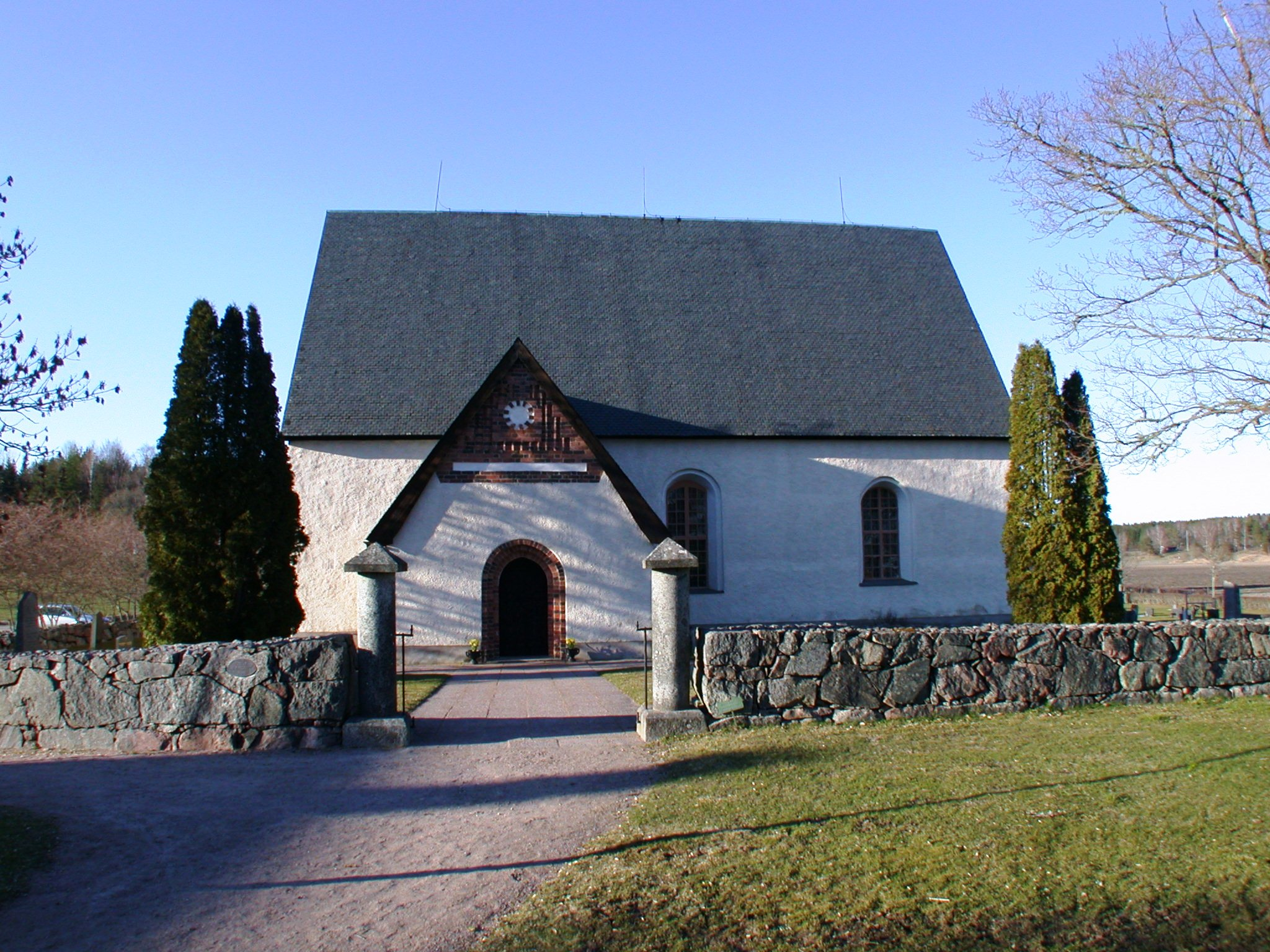
Ekeby Church

Ekeby Church (Swedish: Ekeby kyrka) is a medieval church in Östhammar Municipality, Uppsala County, Sweden. It belongs to the Church of Sweden.

== History and architecture ==
The oldest part of the church is the sacristy, located to the north of the nave. The sacristy dates from the late 13th or early 14th century and was probably originally attached to a wooden church. The main part of the single-nave church that can be seen today was probably built around 1430-1460. The church porch, although slightly later than the rest of the church, was most probably part of the original design. It still contains the door of the earlier, wooden church. The door dates from the late 13th century.

Inside, the vaulting of the church is decorated with fresco. These date from circa 1515-1525 but were plastered over during the 18th century. They were uncovered during a renovation in 1927. The baptismal font dates from the late 13th century, while most of the rest of the church fittings are from the post-Reformation time.
