= Estuna Church =

Coordinates: 59°49′05″N 18°39′08″E

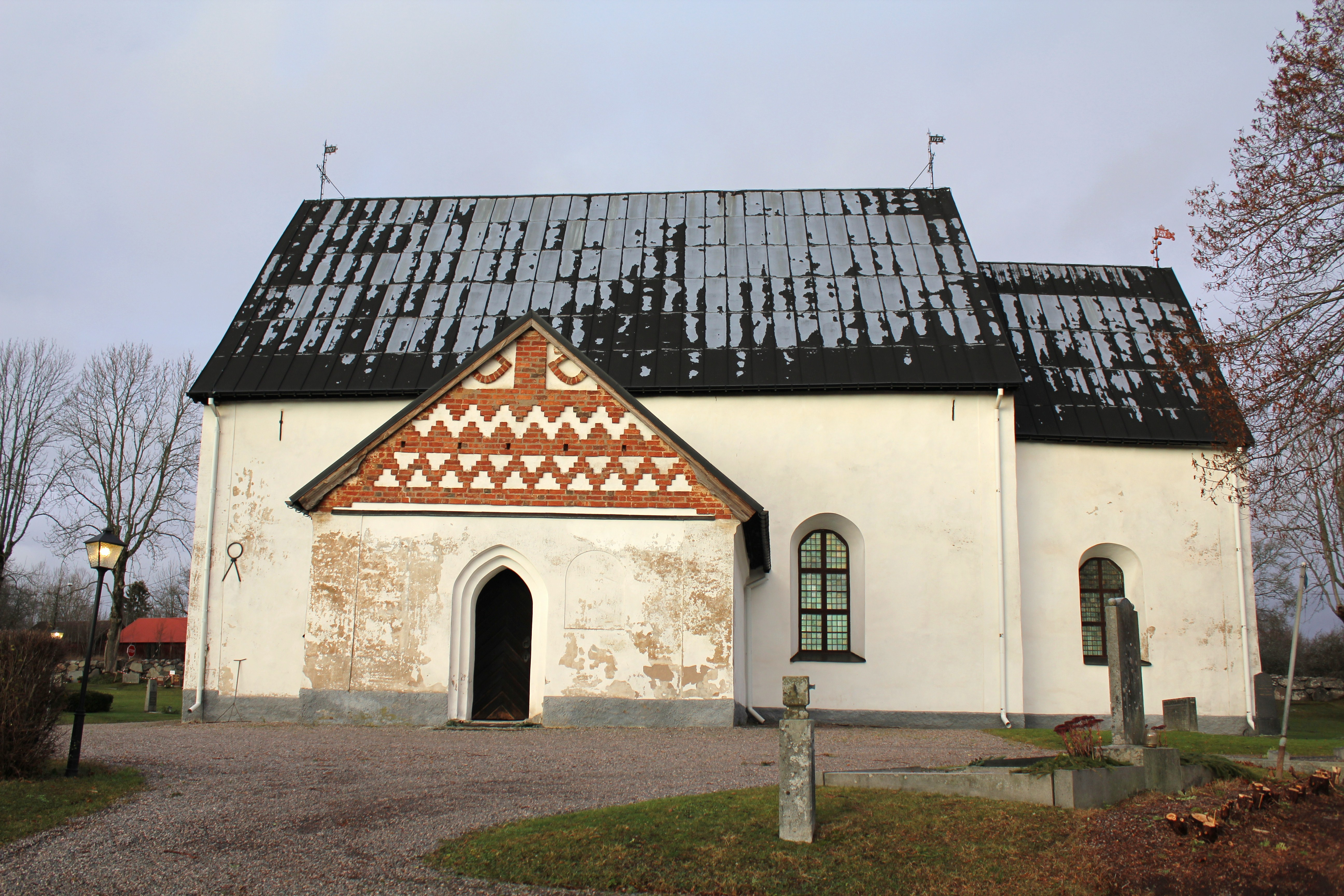
Estuna Church, view of the exterior

Estuna Church (Swedish: Estuna kyrka) is a medieval church belonging to the Church of Sweden in the Archdiocese of Uppsala.

The church dates from the early 13th century or possibly the late 12th century. The structure of the building indicates that a tower was initially planned for the eastern end of the church but never built. It may have been intended as a defensive tower which became redundant as times became more peaceful as the Middle Ages progressed in Sweden. The church has been rebuilt and expanded several times. During a renovation of the altar in 1733 a patch of parchment was discovered that noted the date of a re-inauguration of the church to 1298. This was probably done in connection with an enlargement of the church towards the west. The church porch was added during the 15th century. During a renovation in the 20th century, medieval frescoes were discovered and uncovered. Among the church furnishings, most date from the 18th century. The baptismal font is however older, from the 13th century. The elaborate crucifix was donated to the church in 1783 and made in Rome.
