= Lohärad Church =

Coordinates: 59°48′25″N 18°33′34″E

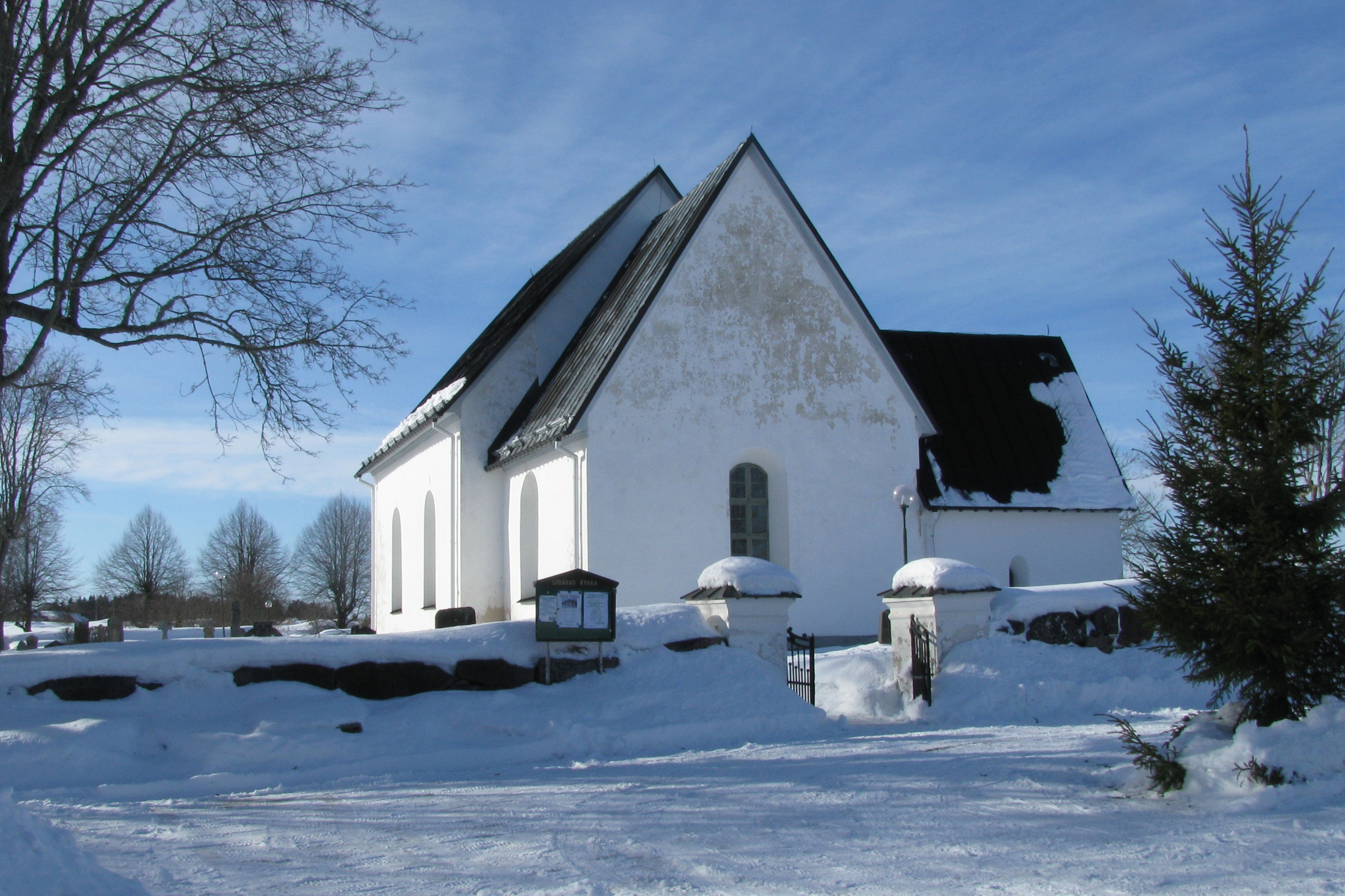
Lohärad Church, view of the exterior

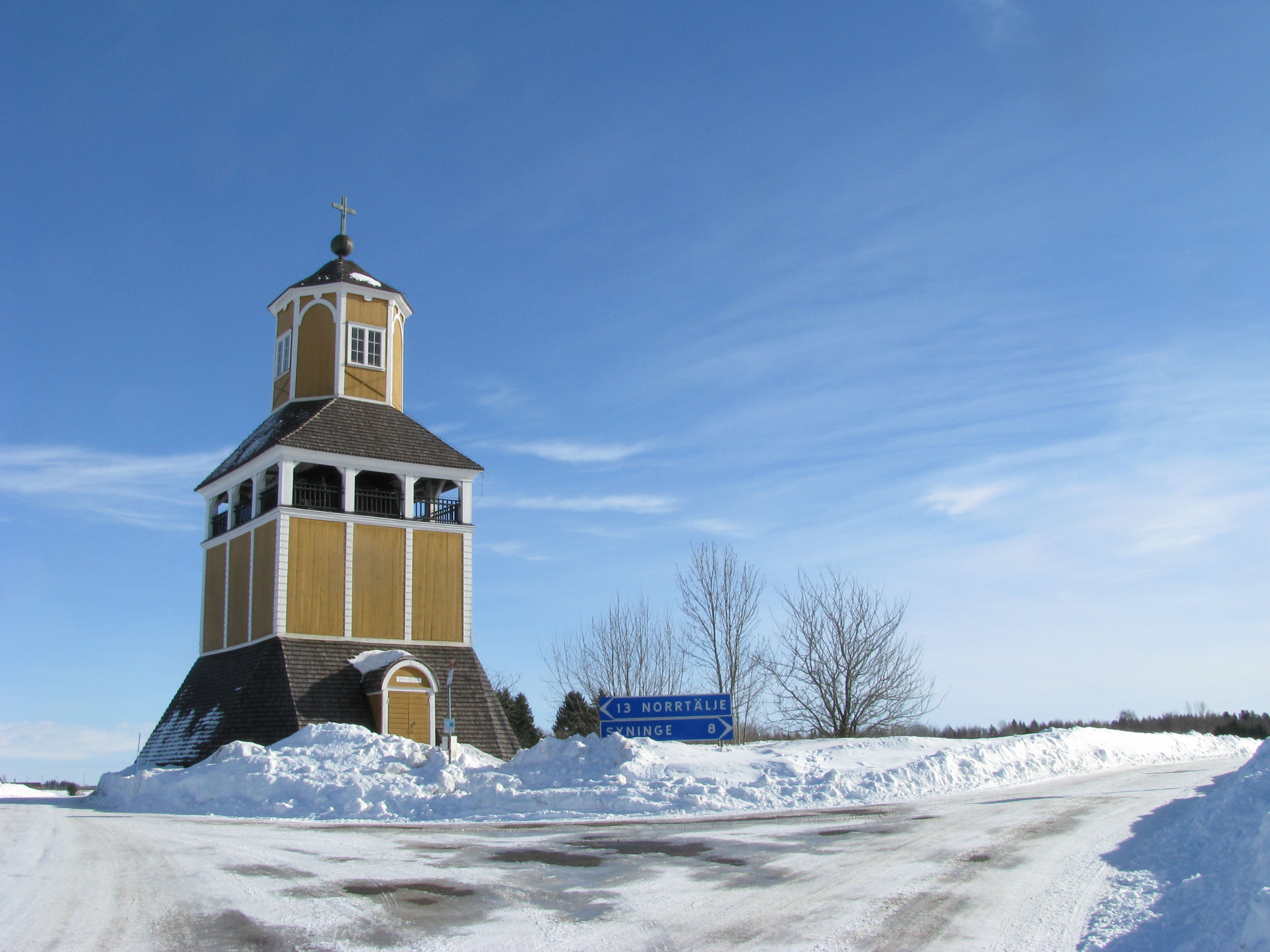
Belfry of Lohärad Church

Lohärad Church (Swedish: Lohärads kyrka) is a medieval church in the Archdiocese of Uppsala (Church of Sweden) in Stockholm County, Sweden.

== History and architecture ==
Lohärad Church was built at the beginning of the 13th century. A sacristy was added at the end of the same century, and a church porch and the internal vaults date from the 15th century. The church originally had a tower but it collapsed in the 1670s, destroying the church porch. A new church porch was built at a later date. The belfry was built in 1838, replacing an earlier belfry from the 17th century. In 1929, fragments of medieval frescos were uncovered behind layers of whitewash inside the church. The church furnishings are mostly from the time after the Reformation, with the exception of a wooden sculpture from the 15th century and a silver paten from the same century. the altarpiece dates from 1762 and was made by a master carpenter in Norrtälje. The church also has in its possession two chasubles from the 18th century, made of black velvet and decorated with silver embroidery.
