= Valö Church =

Coordinates: 60°17′26″N 18°07′08″E

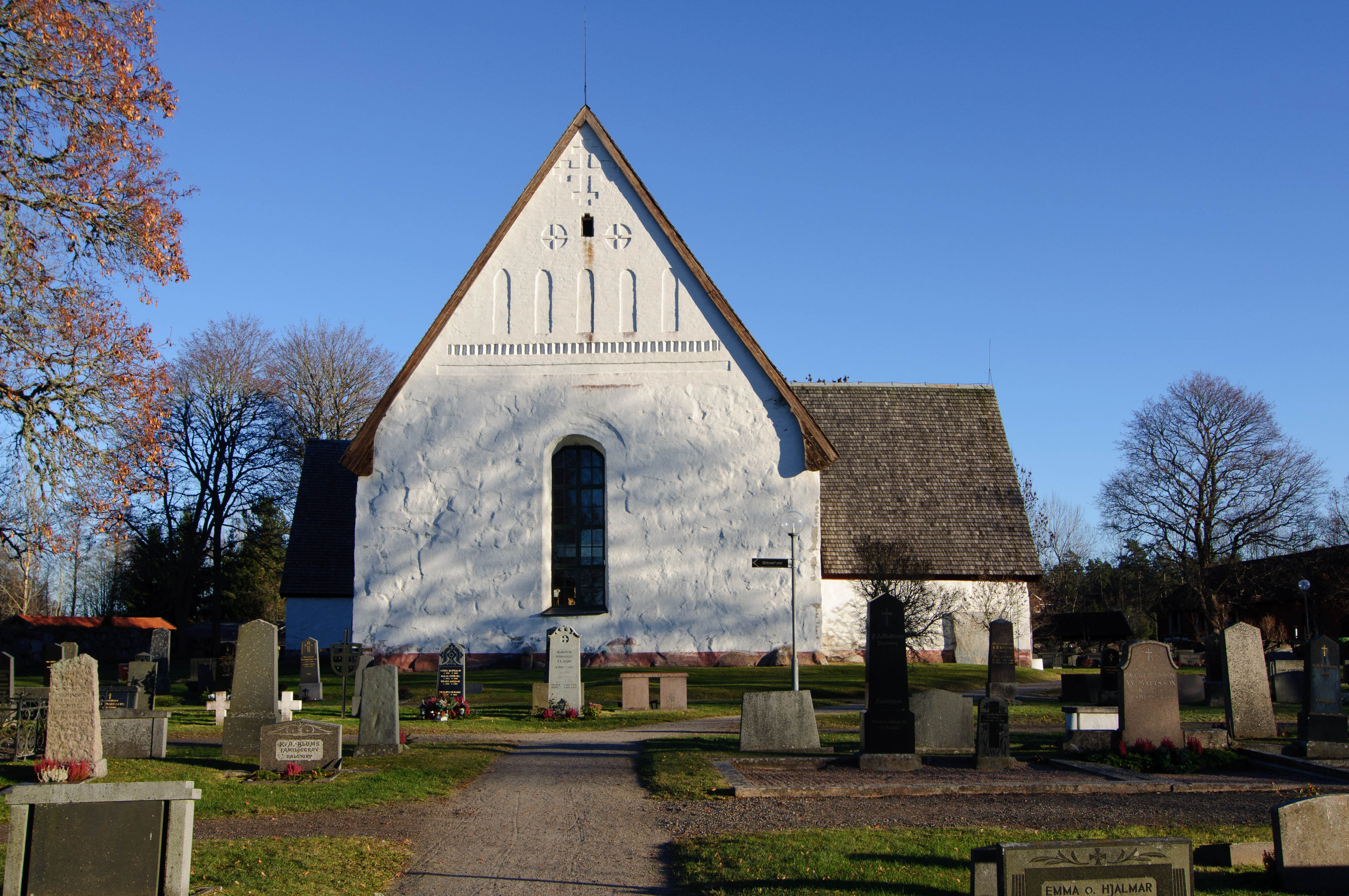
Valö Church, external view

Valö Church (Swedish: Valö kyrka) is a Lutheran church in the Archdiocese of Uppsala in Uppsala County, Sweden. It has been described as one of the most interesting countryside churches in Uppland, with regard to its furnishings and frescos.

== History and architecture ==
The presently visible stone church dates from the 13th century but probably replaced an earlier, wooden church. The exact history of the church is unknown; perhaps it was built at the end of the 13th century.

The church is rectangular, with a protruding church porch and sacristy. Elements of the medieval entrance door have survived in the door between the church porch and the church itself. Inside, the church ceiling is supported by vaults constructed in the 16th century and decorated with frescos, made by an artist known as Örjan the Painter in the 1520s.

The church is unusually rich in furnishings. It houses three medieval altarpieces. The most ornate one was made in Antwerp and was probably made in 1515. The two others were made in present-day Germany and Sweden respectively and both date from the 15th century. In addition, the church has two crucifixes, also dating from the 15th century and also made in Germany and Sweden respectively. An additional three carved wooden statuettes of saints' date from the same century. The church also has in its possession two processional staffs from the Middle Ages, both originally decorated with angels.
