= Järlåsa Church =

Church in Järlåsa, Sweden

Coordinates: 59°54′33″N 17°12′47″E

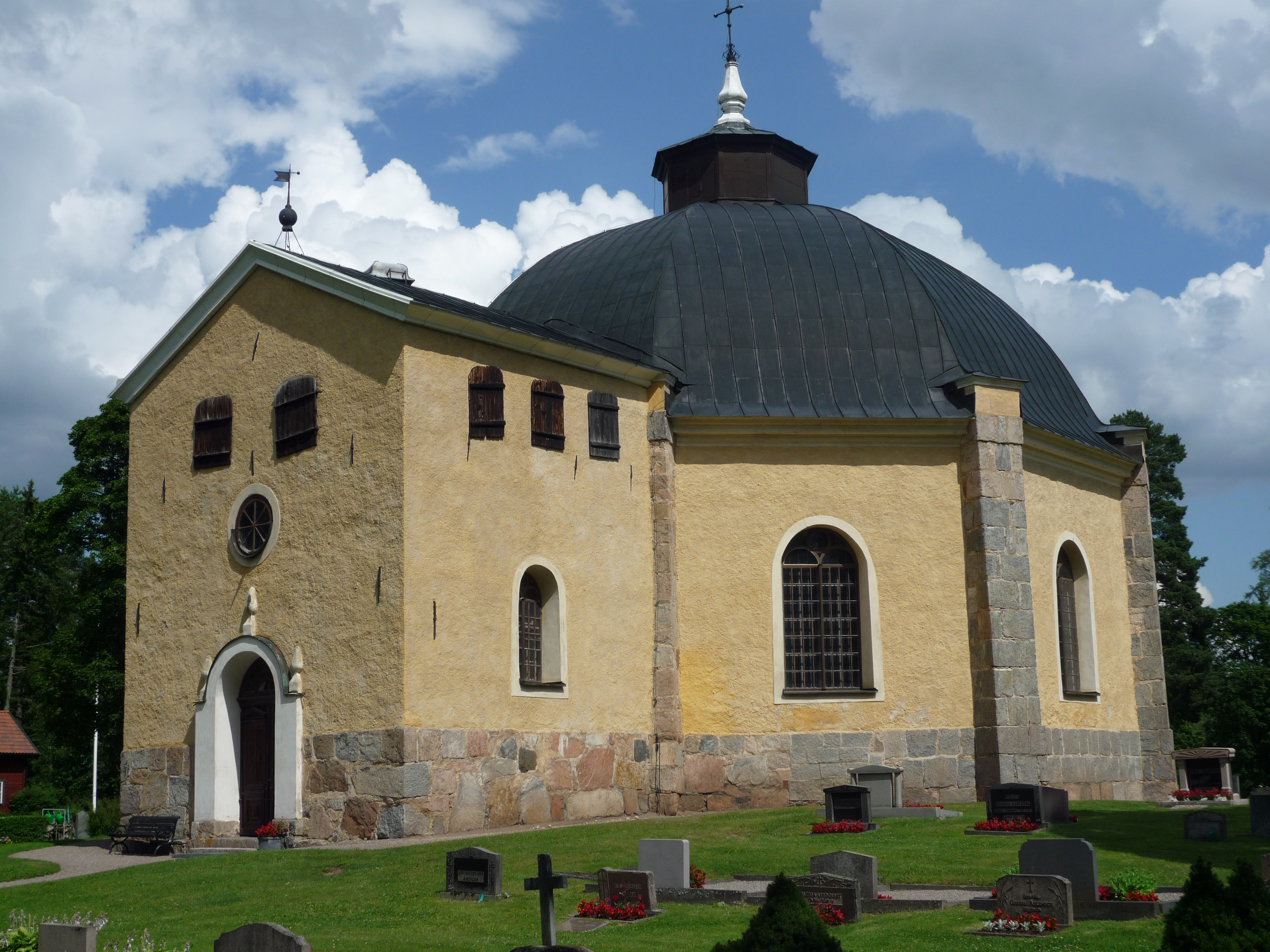
Järlåsa Church

Järlåsa Church (Swedish: Järlåsa kyrka) is a church in Järlåsa, Uppsala County, Sweden. It is part of the Archdiocese of Uppsala (Church of Sweden).

== History and architecture ==
The church has had at least two predecessors. The earliest one was a medieval stone church whose ruins still remains c. 500 metres (1,600 ft) north of the church. At some point it was replaced with a wooden church, which was however in such a bad shape in the 17th century that it was replaced with the presently visible, octagonal church and demolished in the early 18th century.

The church may have been designed by Nicodemus Tessin the Elder; it was built at the initiative of Baron Gustaf Rosenhane, who is documented with having employed Tessin for other building projects. The main, octagonal church building was built 1672-1688 and inaugurated on 29 June 1688, while the church porch wasn't finished until 1704. Originally the sacristy was a wooden annex but it was replaced with a stone structure in 1766–68.
