= Boglösa Church =

Church in Enköping Municipality, Sweden

Coordinates: 59°35′46″N 17°10′39″E

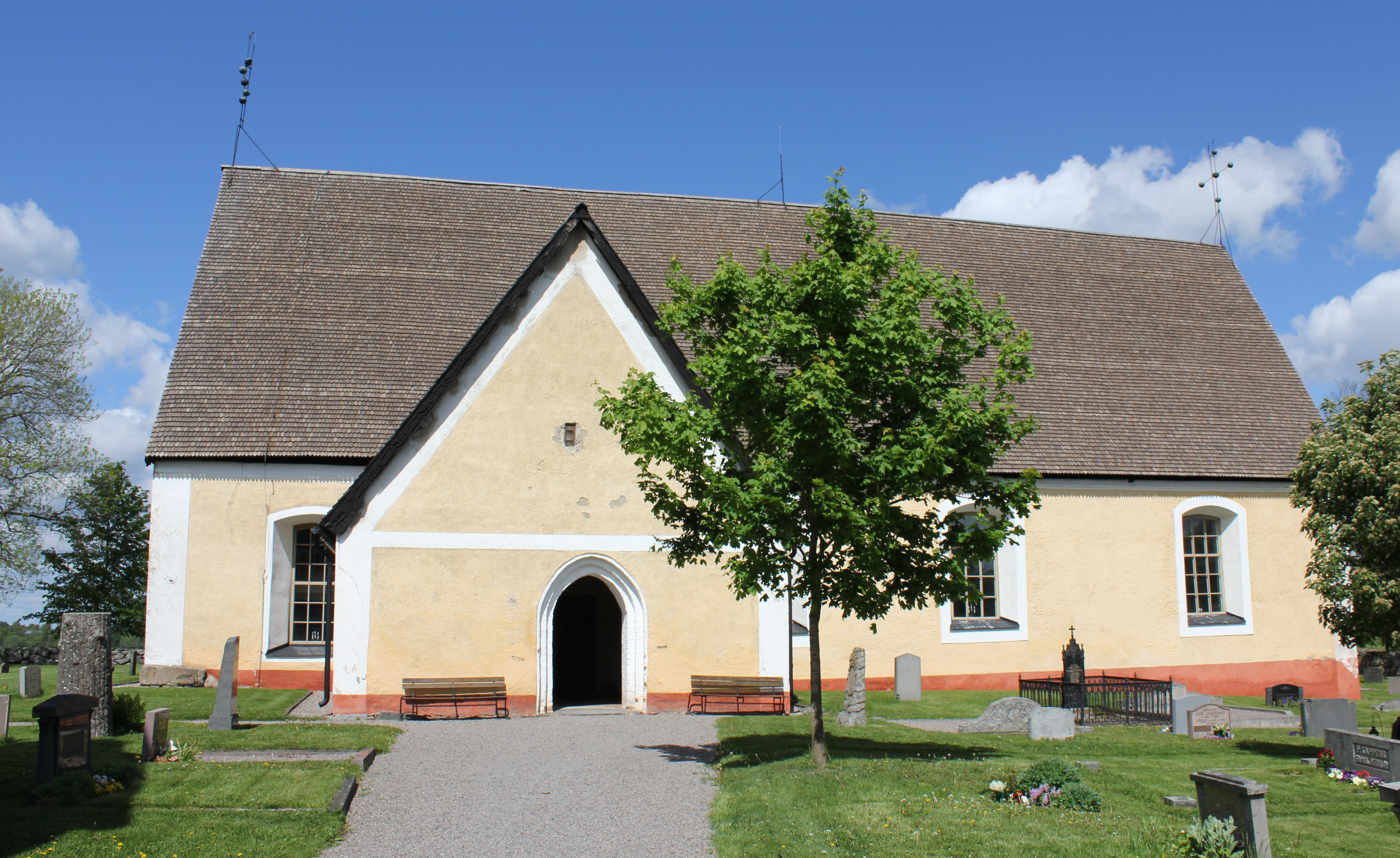
Boglösa Church, external view

Boglösa Church (Swedish: Boglösa kyrka) is a medieval Lutheran church in the Archdiocese of Uppsala a few kilometres south of Enköping in Uppsala County, Sweden.

== History and architecture ==
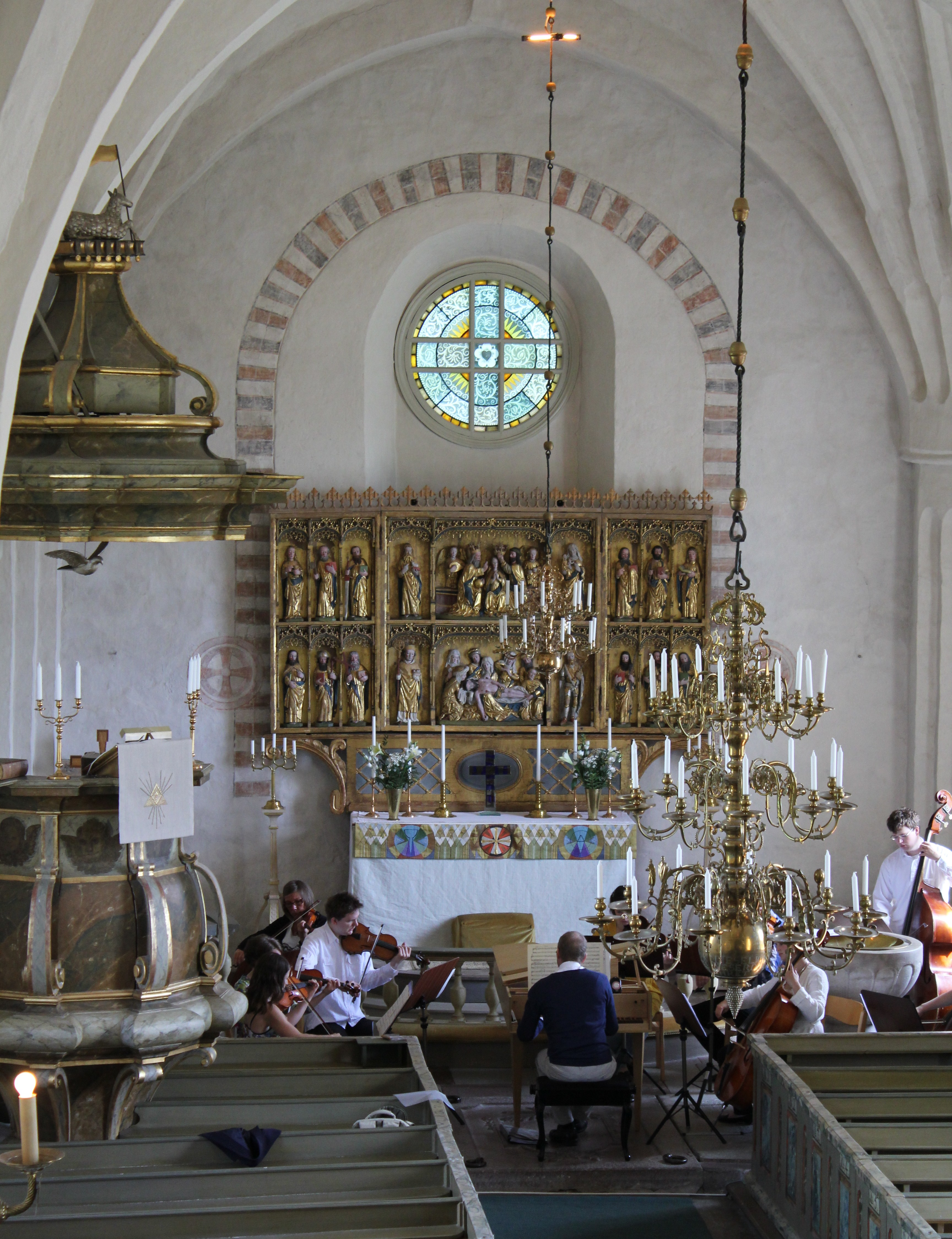
Interior view towards the choir and altarpiece

Boglösa Church lies in an area with old cultural traditions; notably, there are several preserved petroglyphs in the vicinity of the church. According to an old tradition, a battle against an unnamed enemy was once fought on the site of the church.

The oldest parts of the church dates from the early Middle Ages, i.e. the 12th or 13th century. The church was enlarged during the 14th century, and during the 15th century the wooden ceiling was replaced with brick vaults. The church was further enlarged during the 18th century, and received larger windows. A renovation was carried out in 1957-59.

Among the furnishings, the altarpiece (15th century) merits special attention. It was originally made for Stockholm Cathedral but sold to Boglösa Church already in 1470. There is also a church tabernacle and a triumphal cross from the 14th century in the church, as well as a medieval baptismal font made on Gotland. The pulpit and the pews are from 1744. The organ dates from 1844.
