= Edebo Church =

Church in Norrtälje Municipality, Stockholm County, Sweden

Coordinates: 60°00′28″N 18°34′38″E

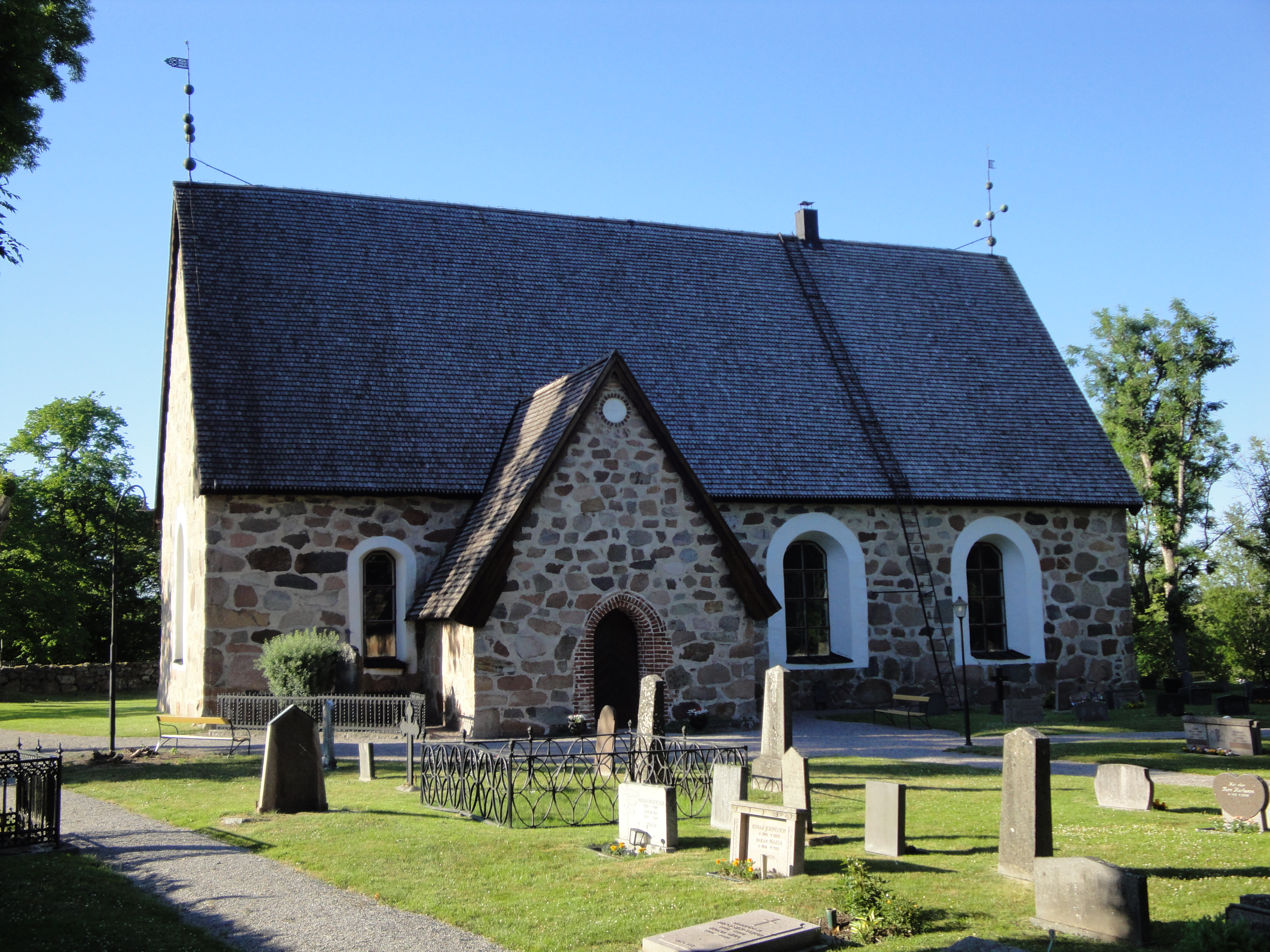
Edebo Church, external view

Edebo Church (Swedish: Edebo kyrka) is a medieval Lutheran church in Norrtälje Municipality, Stockholm County, Sweden. It belongs to the Archdiocese of Uppsala.

== History and architecture ==
Edebo is mentioned in written sources for the first time in 1291. The first church at the site was probably wooden and may have been erected sometime 1250-1350. The wooden church was replaced with the currently visible stone church during the late 15th century. The church porch was probably added at the beginning of the 16th century. During this time the church was also decorated internally with frescos. The sacristy was built 1748, and the wooden bell tower possibly in 1758. These were partially covered with whitewash during the 18th century, when the windows were enlarged and the church received new furnishings in Baroque style. The church was renovated ion 1911-13 by architect Sigurd Curman; during the renovation the frescos were also restored.

The building material of the church is fieldstone, with brick used for the finer details.
