= Ununge Church =

Coordinates: 59°55′42″N 18°35′10″E

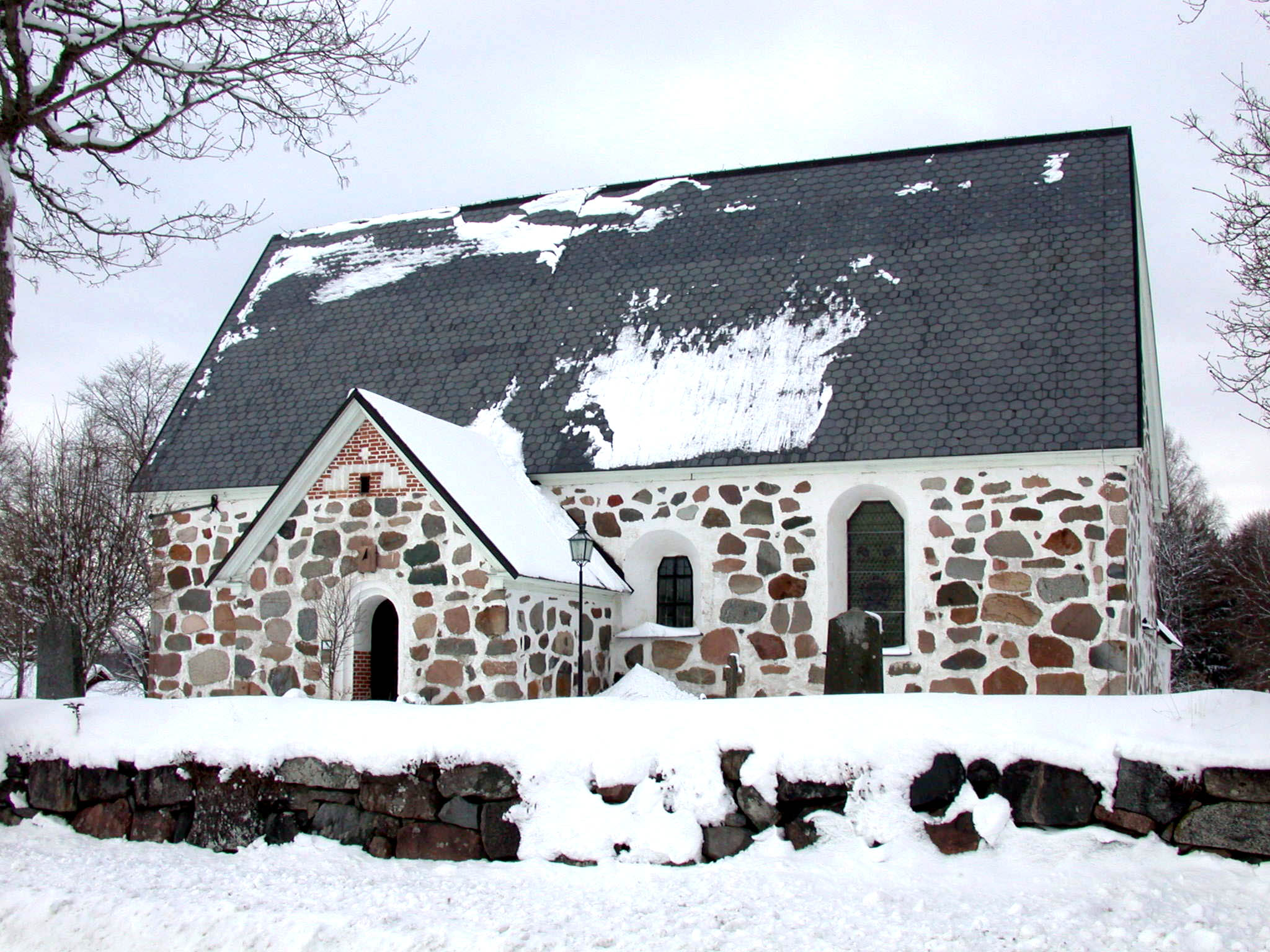
Ununge Church, view of the exterior

Ununge Church (Swedish: Ununge kyrka) is a medieval church belonging to the Church of Sweden in the Diocese of Uppsala.

The church was probably built at the end of the 13th century, but has been rebuilt and expanded on several occasions. The easternmost part of the church has been dated to the end of the 14th or to the 15th century. In its layout, the church is a typical example of medieval churches from Uppland. It consists of a rectangular, single-nave church hall consisting of three bays of which the easternmost is the choir. There is a sacristy to the north and a church porch to the south. The oldest of the church fittings are the triumphal cross from the 13th century, which has been described as one of the finest of its kind in Sweden and which resembles contemporary triumphal crosses from Denmark, and the baptismal font, also from the 13th century. The interior of the church was renovated in 1897.
