= Alunda Church =

Coordinates: 60°03′36″N 18°05′25″E

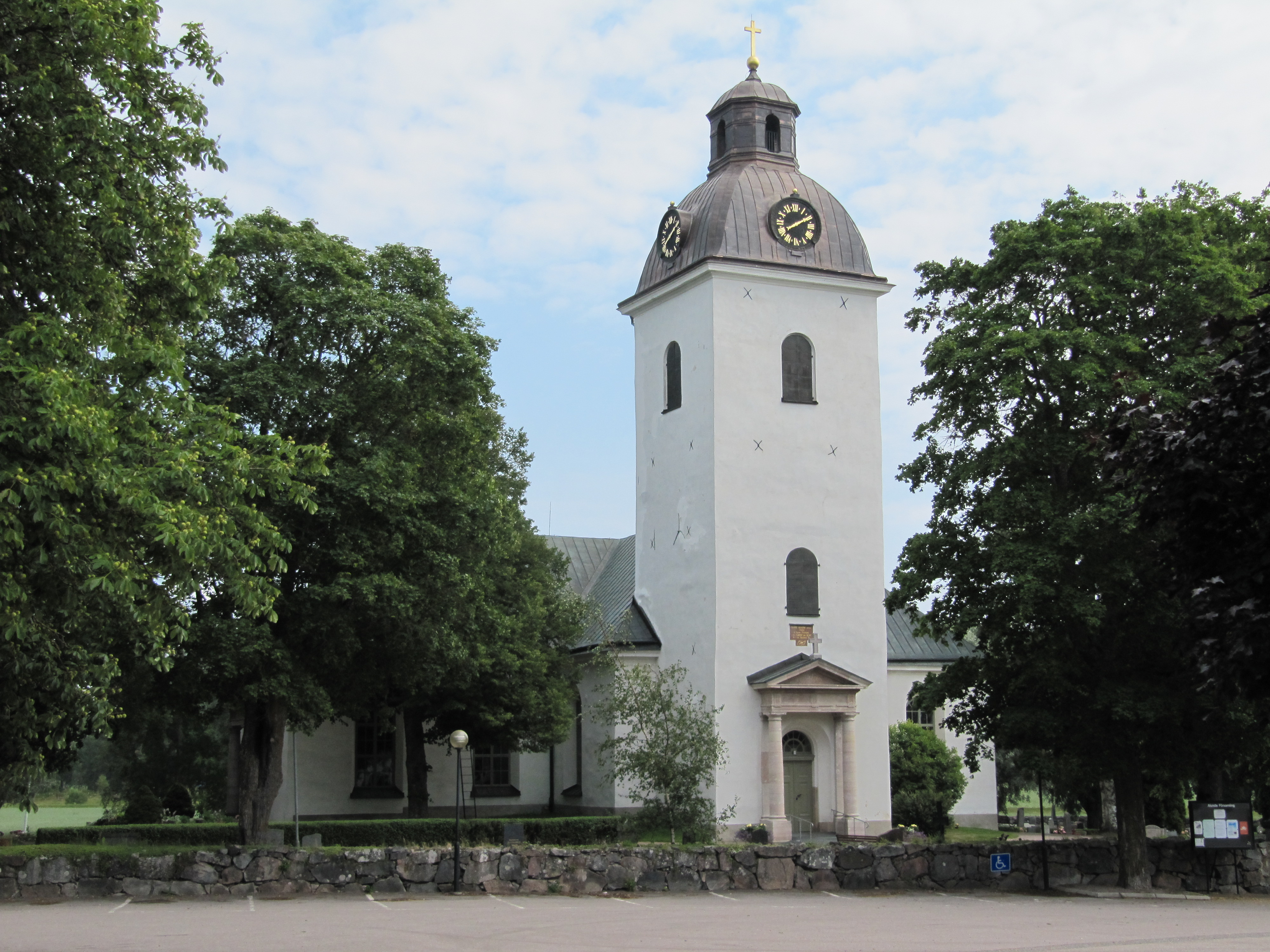
Alunda Church, external view

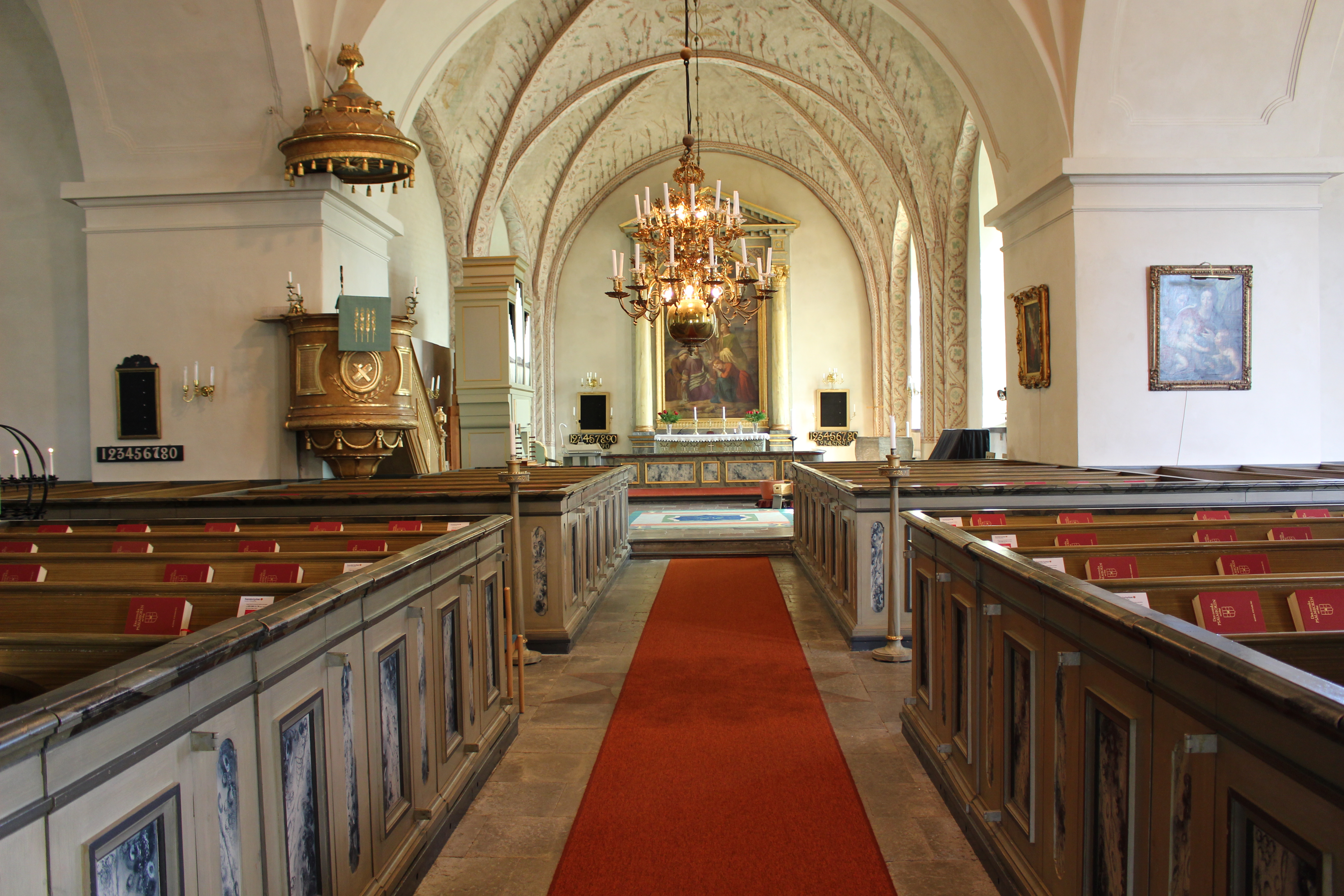
Alunda Church, interior view

Alunda Church (Swedish: Alunda kyrka) is a Lutheran church at Alunda in Östhammar Municipality, Uppsala County, Sweden. The church is associated with the Archdiocese of Uppsala of the Church of Sweden.

== History and architecture ==
The oldest part of the church date from the 13th century, and the church was expanded to its present size during the 15th century. During this time the church also received internal brick vault. The church has been ravaged by fire in 1542, 1715 and 1859. Renovations have been carried out in 1898-1899 and in 1937 under the direction of architect Ärland Noreen (1888-1970).

Among the furnishings, an altarpiece from 1862 was painted by the artist Johan Zacharias Blackstadius (1816-1898) with a framework carved by sculptor Fredrik Smedberg. The baptismal font is from the 15th century. The pulpit was carved in 1796 by Johan Westberg (1732-1811).

The congregation is cooperating with a congregation in Marijampolė, Lithuania.
