= Roslags-Bro Church =

Church in Norrtälje Municipality, Stockholm County, Sweden

Coordinates: 59°49′47″N 18°44′13″E

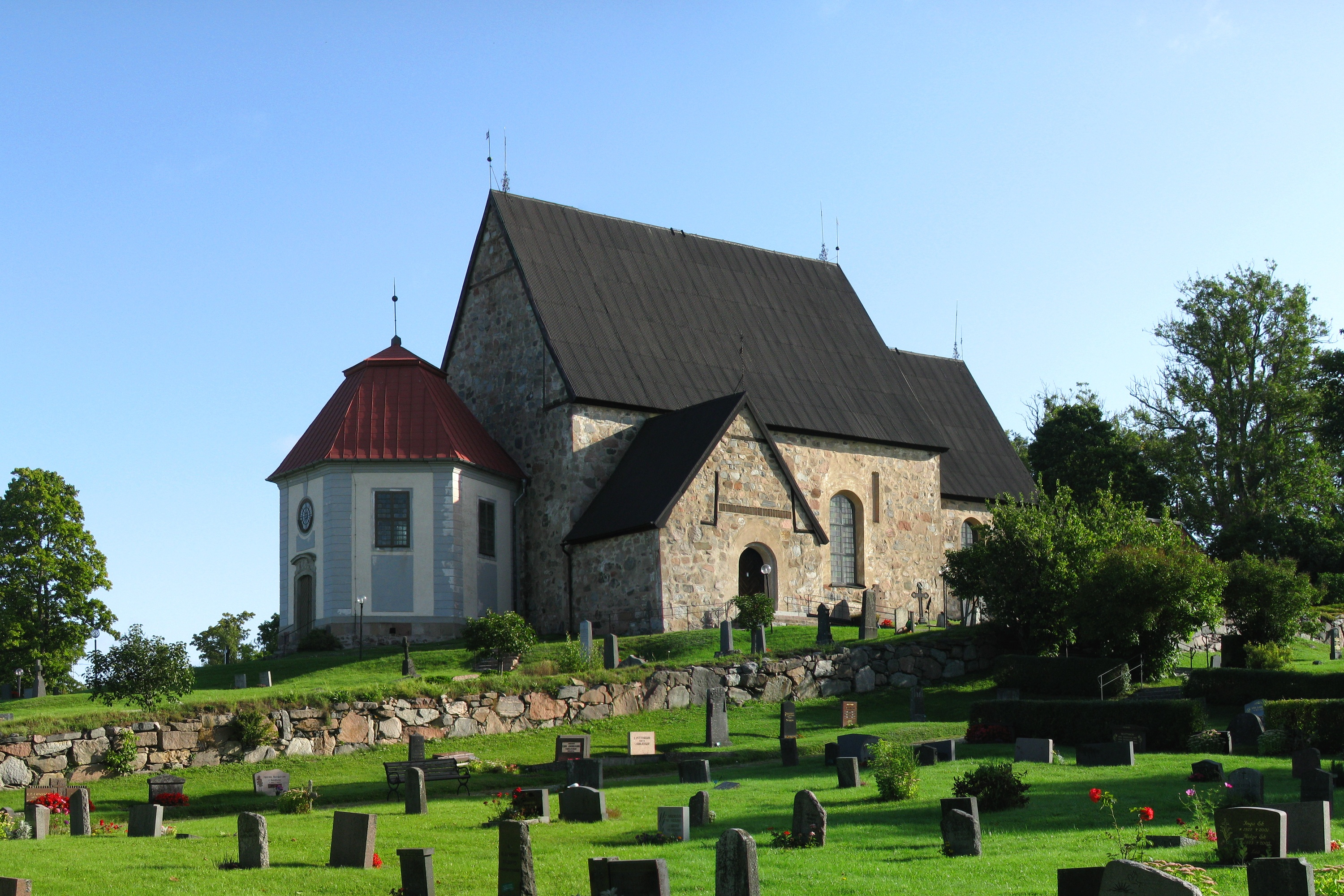
Roslags-Bro Church, external view

Roslags-Bro Church (Swedish: Roslags-Bro kyrka) is a medieval Lutheran church in the Archdiocese of Uppsala in Stockholm County, Sweden. It was built during the middle of the 13th century by an important sea-route, since disappeared as a consequence of the post-glacial rebound. Immured in the church is a runestone from the 11th century.

== History ==
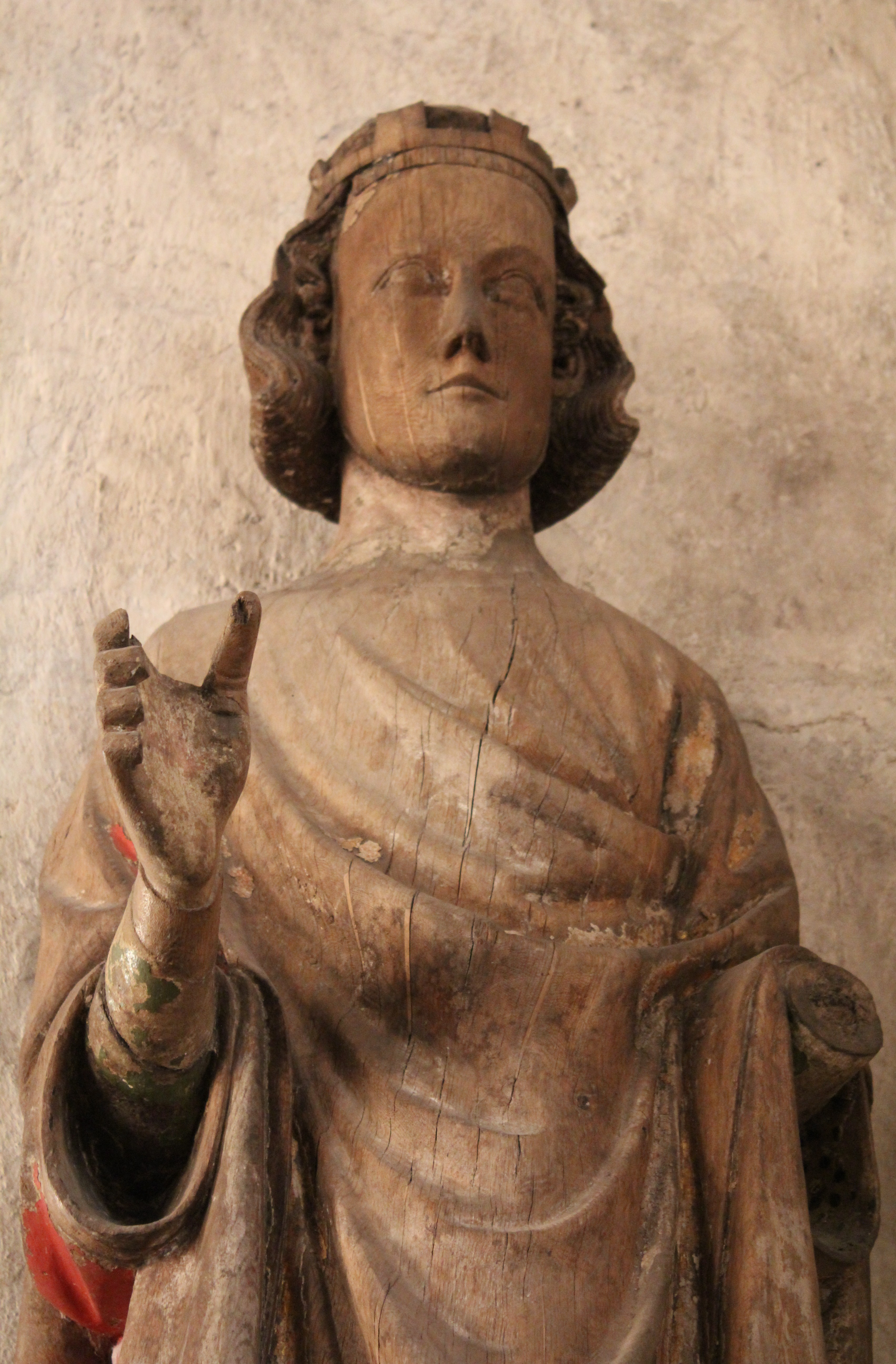
Medieval wooden statue which has served as a model for the coat of arms of Stockholm

When Roslags-Bro church was built in the 13th century it was located by a once important sea-route which has since disappeared as a consequence of post-glacial rebound. Immured in the church is a runestone from the 11th century raised in memory of a man who was killed in Estonia across the Baltic Sea (runestone U533). Throughout the Middle Ages, the church was one of the most important churches in Roslagen, and one of the first stone churches in the area. Archbishop Nathan Söderblom still referred to the church as "the Cathedral of Roslagen".

Several details, notably the extensive use of sandstone from Gotland and the church's triumphal cross and baptismal font coming from there, indicate the workshop building the church might have come from Gotland.

During the 15th century, the choir was added and the ceiling further vaulted and decorated with frescos. The latter have never been painted over and so retain much of their original brilliance. It has been suggested that Sten Sture the Elder might have commissioned them.

During the 18th century the windows of the church were enlarged to their present size and an external wooden bell tower erected. Two free-standing burial chapels were added close to the church in the cemetery, and one attached to the western gable by Vendela Magnona Fleming for her and her husband, Duke Carl Gabrielsson Oxenstierna. It displays the coats of arms of the Fleming and Oxenstierna families.

== Architecture ==
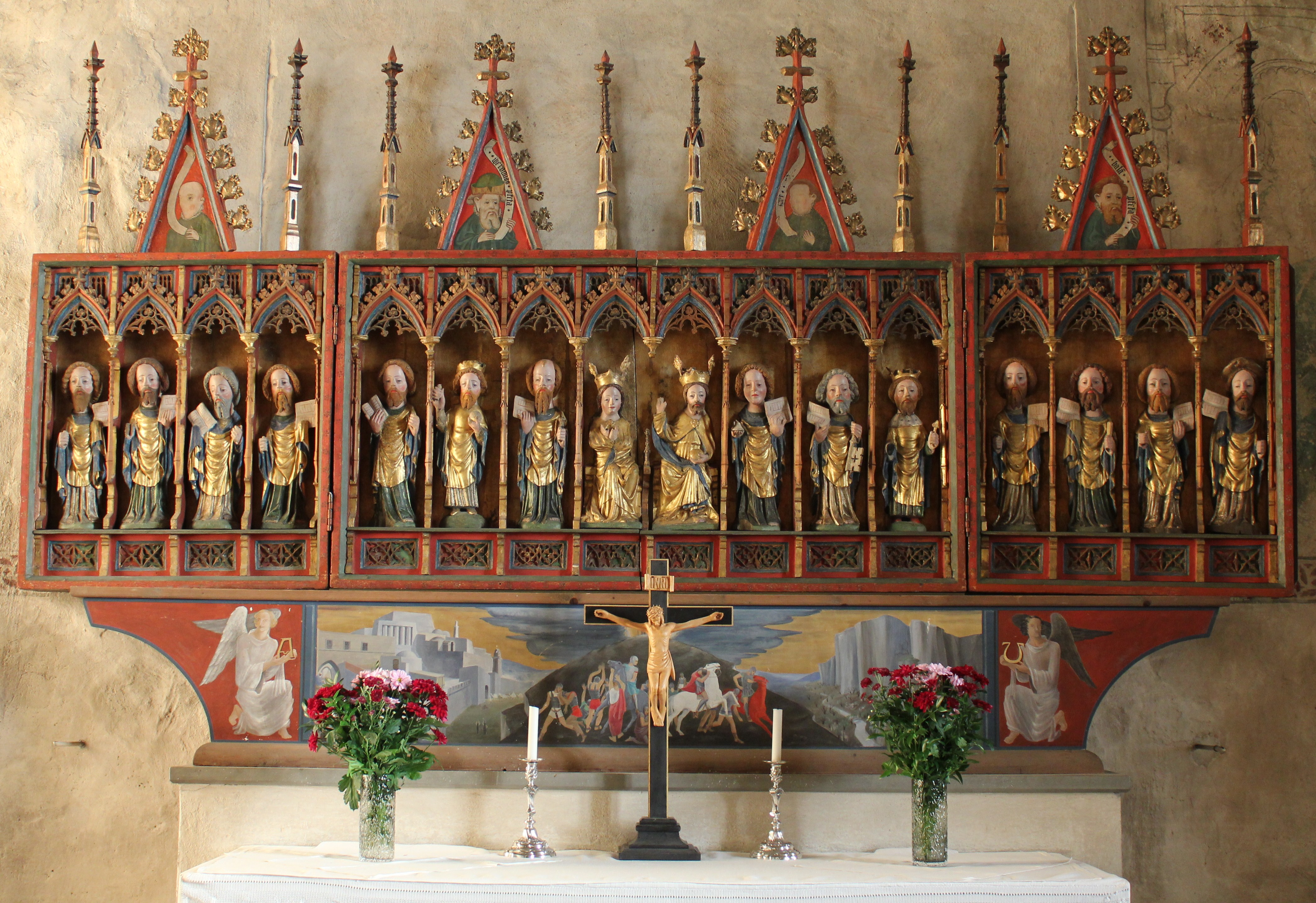
The altarpiece (early 15th century)

Despite a few later additions and alterations, Roslags-Bro Church is considered to be a representative example of a medieval church in Uppland. Externally the church retains much of its original look, characterised by roughly hewn stones and high Gothic gables, save the strikingly different Fleming-Oxenstierna burial chapel.

The interior features frescoes, largely purely ornamental of foliage. Church furnishings include a baptismal font and triumphal cross made on Gotland. Also housed is a wooden sculpture of a male saint, traditionally considered a depiction of St. Erik or possibly Saint Olaf. The statue has served as a model for the coat of arms of Stockholm, of which St. Erik is the patron saint. The church has an altarpiece from the early 15th century, one of the oldest in Sweden. In addition, it houses a 14th-century Madonna and a sculpture of Saint Stephen from the 15th century.

Another unusual piece of wooden sculpture from the church is a medieval coffin with a statue of Christ. On Good Friday the congregation places the statue in the coffin. Before they arrive again on Easter Sunday the priest removes the statue and so illustrates Christ has risen from the dead.

Among later furnishings, the pulpit is from circa 1700 and the organ from 1838. The church also has some carved wooden epitaphs of families from the Swedish nobility on display.

== Gallery ==
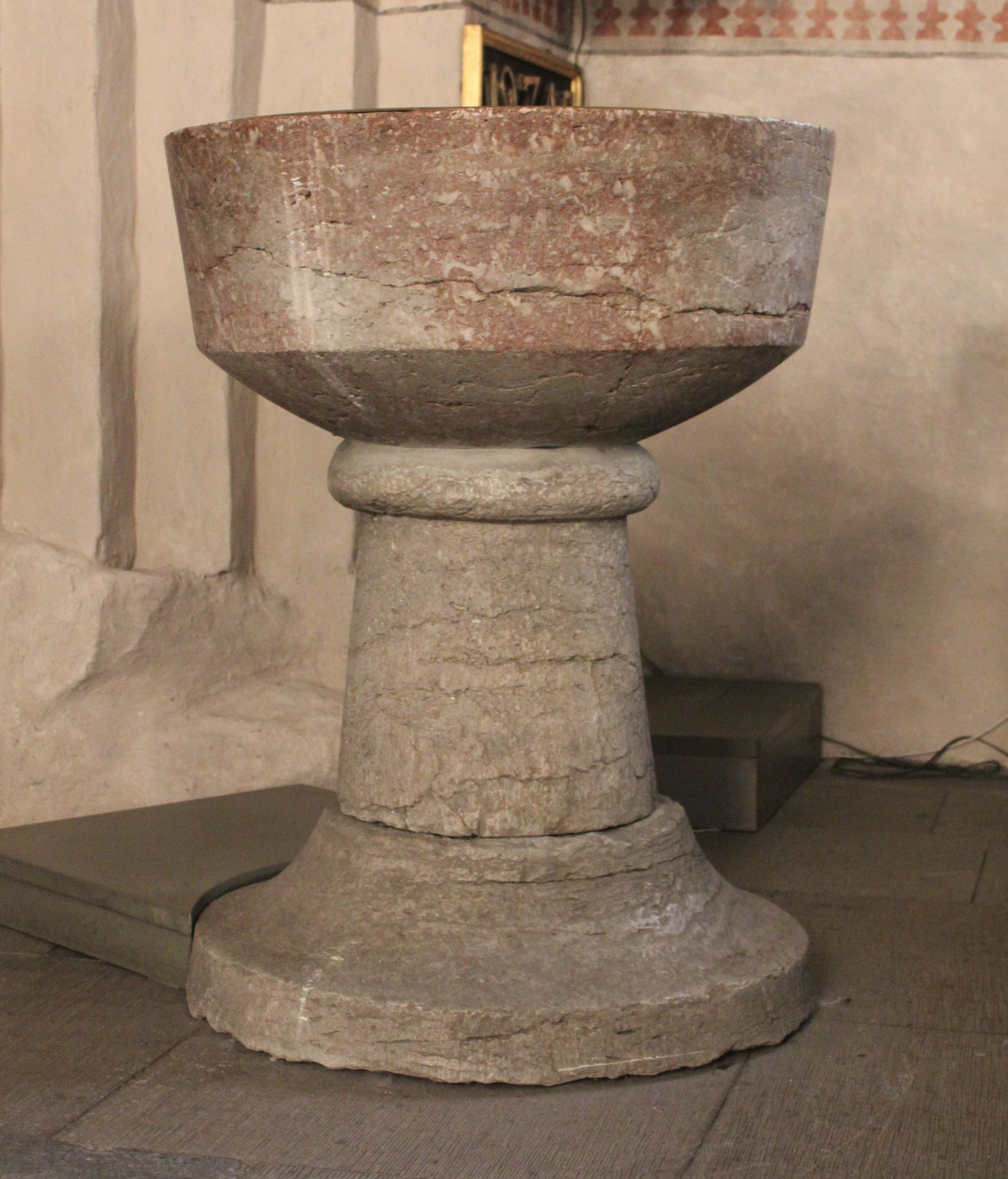
Baptismal font

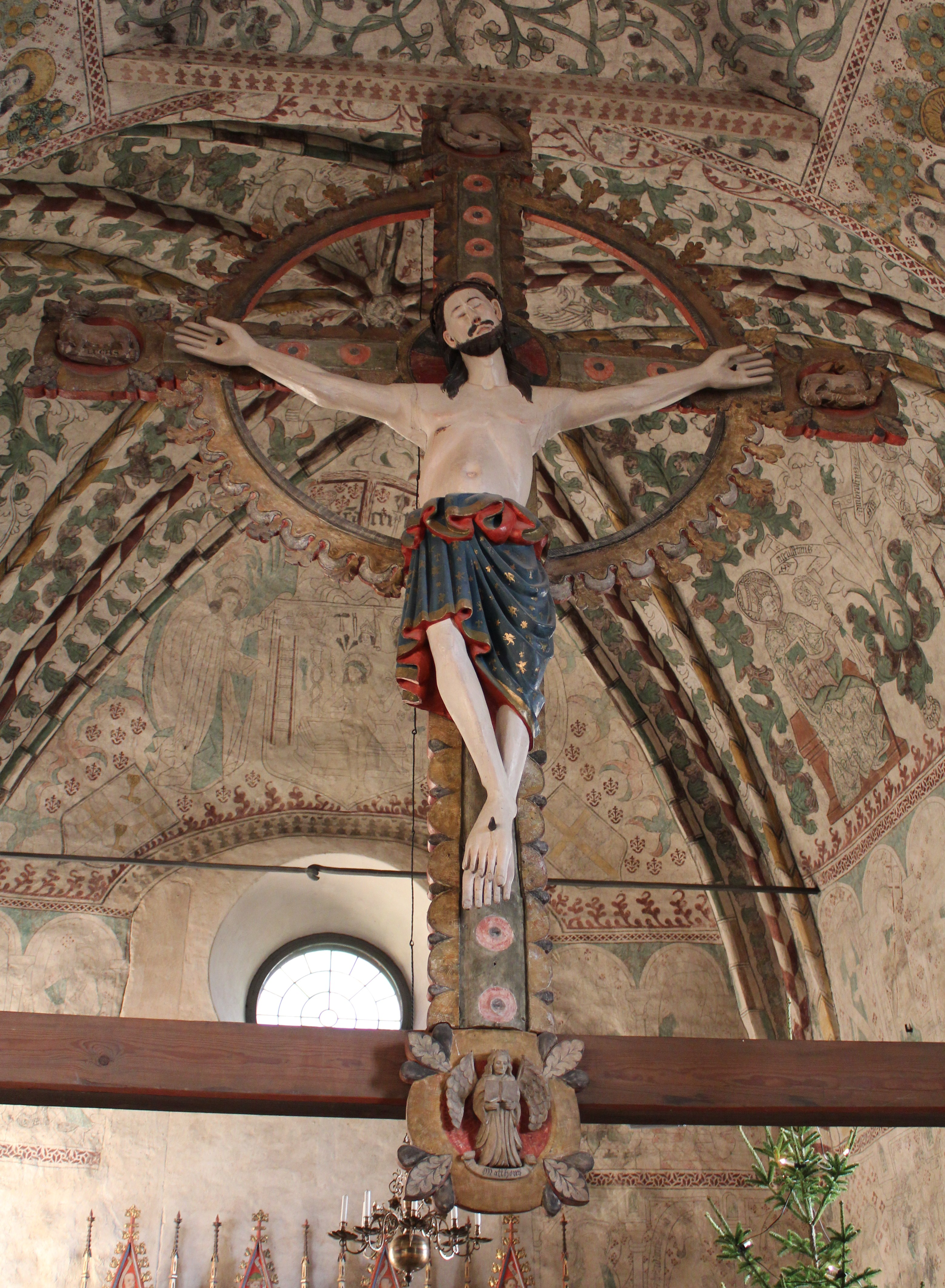
Triumphal cross

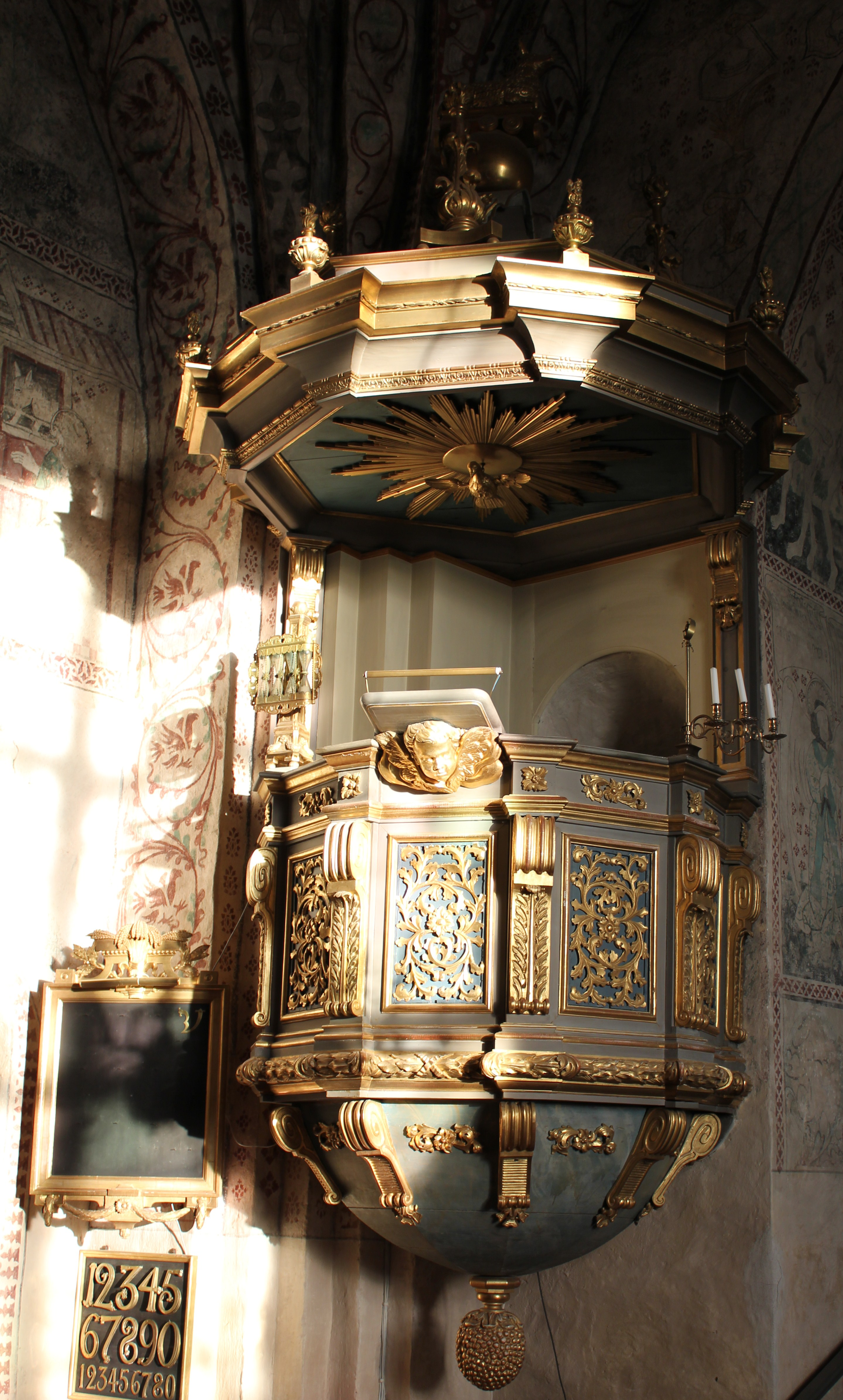
Pulpit

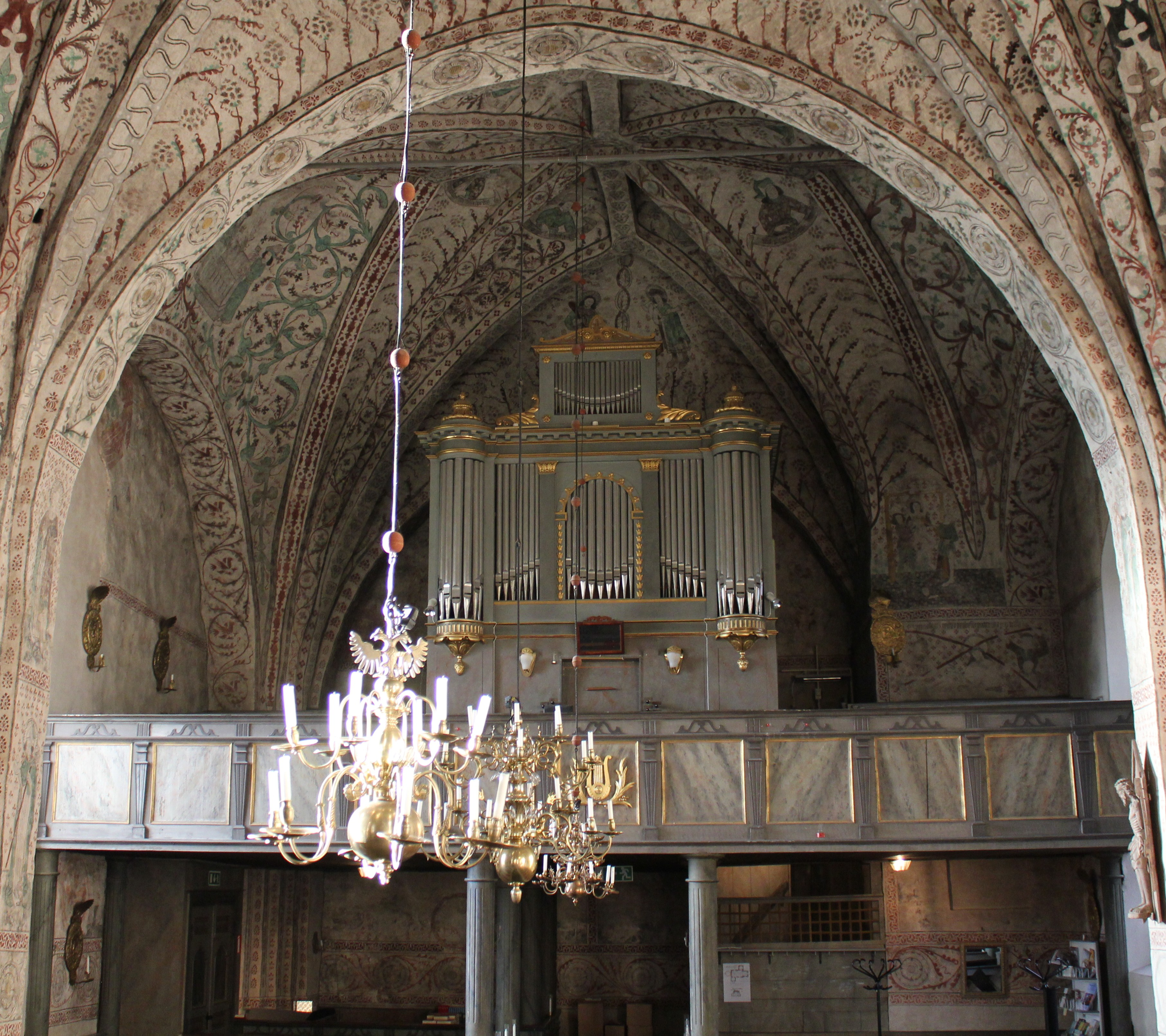
Organ
