= Nave =

Central part of a church

Plan of a large Latin cross church with nave highlighted

Strict definition

Broader definition

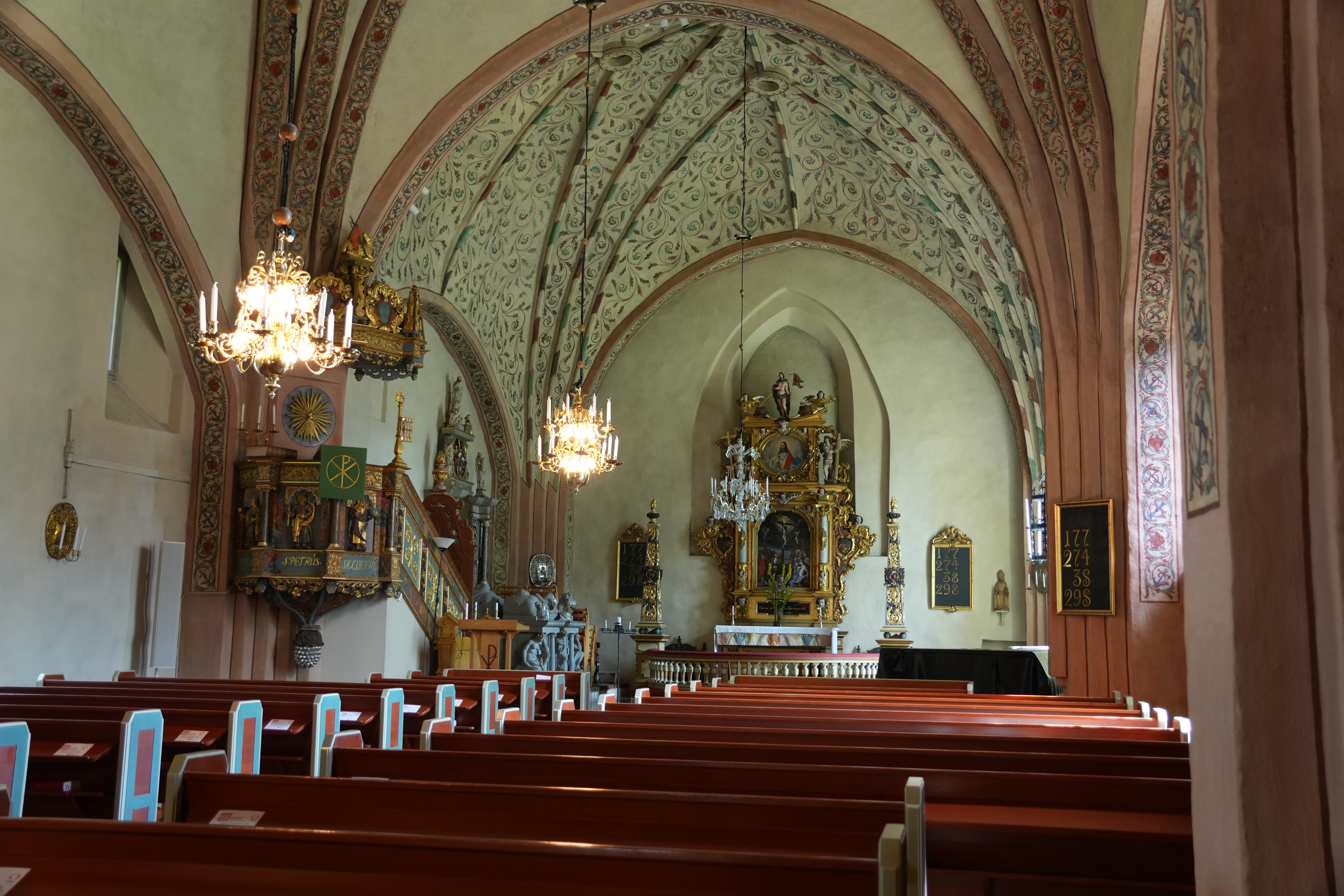
The nave of Länna Church in Norrtälje, Sweden

The nave of the Saint-Sulpice Church in Paris

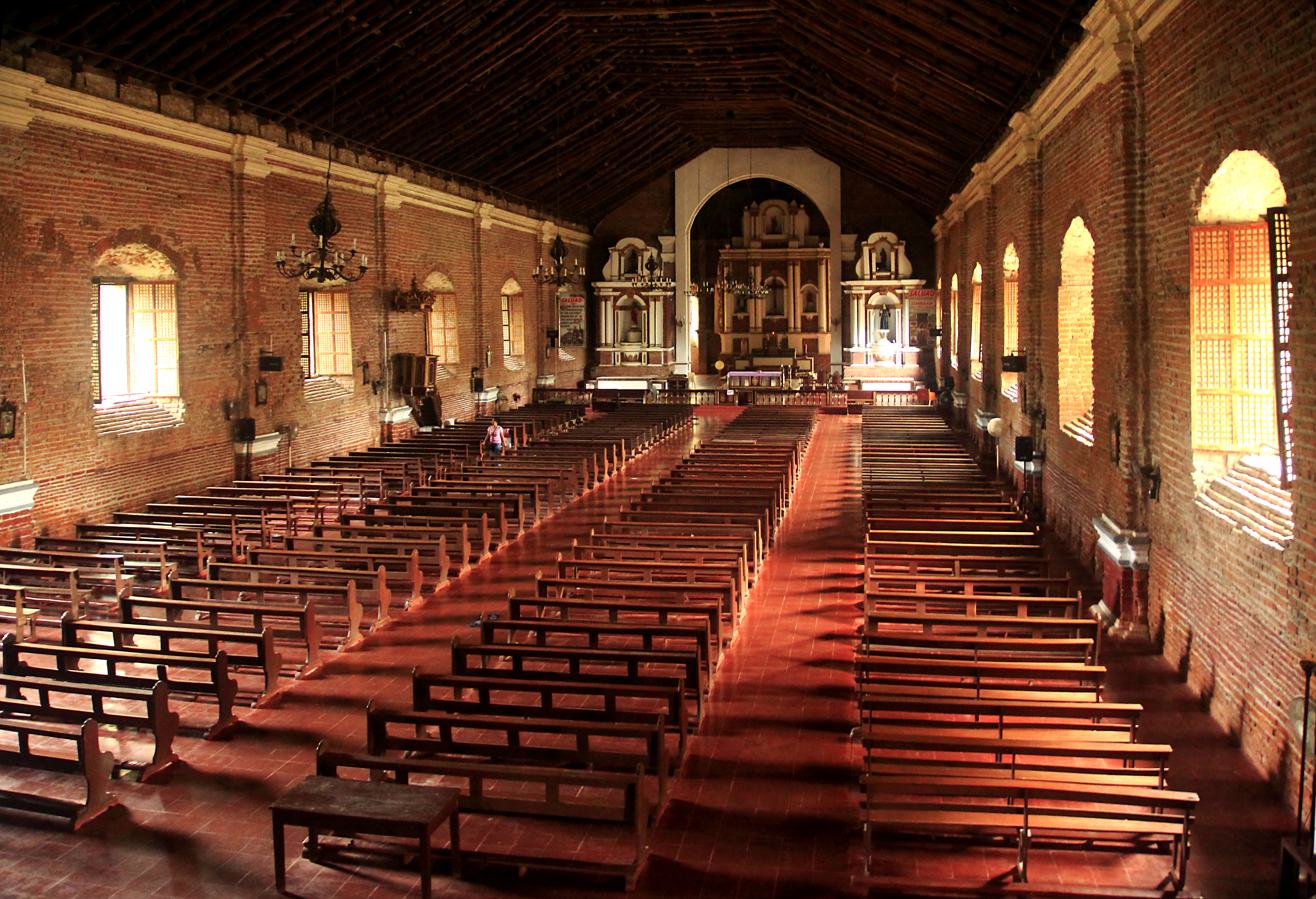
The nave of the Santa Monica Parish Church in Sarrat, Philippines

The nave (/neɪv/) is the central part of a church, stretching from the (normally western) main entrance or rear wall, to the transepts, or in a church without transepts, to the chancel. When a church contains side aisles, as in a basilica-type building, the strict definition of the term "nave" is restricted to the central aisle. In a broader, more colloquial sense, the nave includes all areas available for the lay worshippers, including the side-aisles and transepts. Either way, the nave is distinct from the area reserved for the choir and clergy.

== Description ==
The nave extends from the entry—which may have a separate vestibule (the narthex)—to the chancel and may be flanked by lower side-aisles separated from the nave by an arcade. If the aisles are high and of a width comparable to the central nave, the structure is sometimes said to have three naves. It provides the central approach to the high altar.

== Etymology ==
The term nave is from navis, the Latin word for ship, an early Christian symbol of the Church as a whole, with a possible connection to the "Ship of St. Peter" or the Ark of Noah. The term may also have been suggested by the keel shape of the vaulting of a church. In many Nordic and Baltic countries a model ship is commonly found hanging in the nave of a church, and in some languages the same word means both 'nave' and 'ship', as for instance Danish skib, Swedish skepp, Dutch schip or Spanish nave.

== History ==
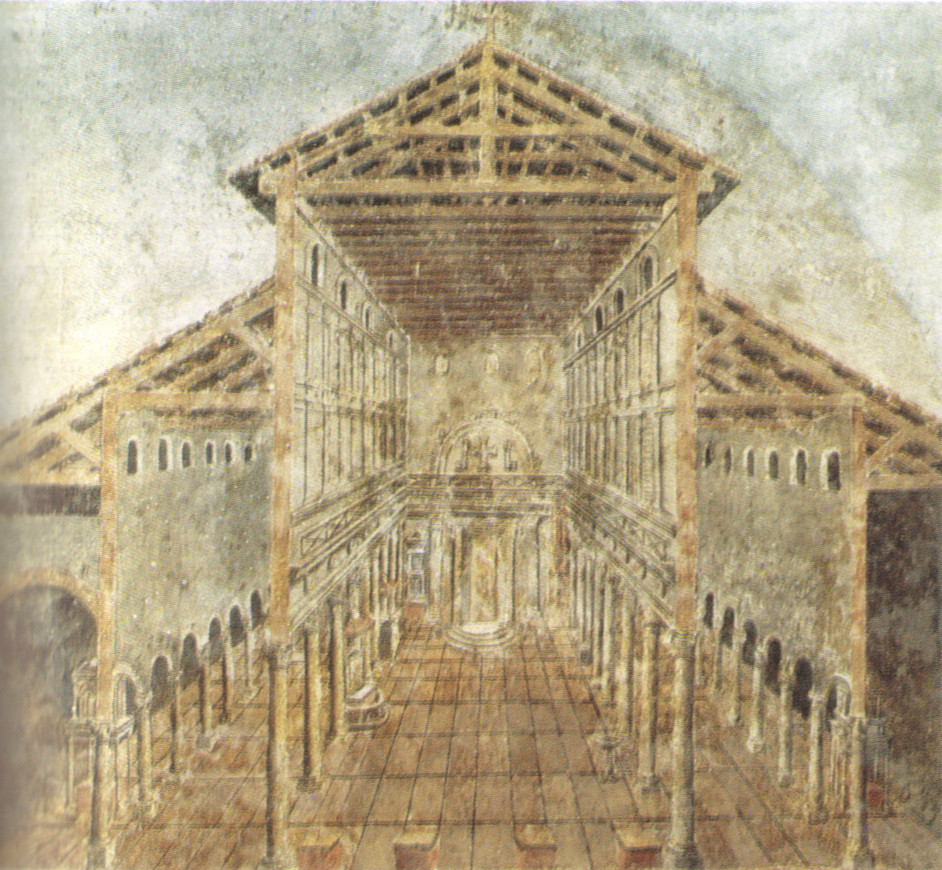
A fresco showing Old St Peter's Basilica, built in the 4th century: the central area, illuminated by high windows, is flanked by aisles.

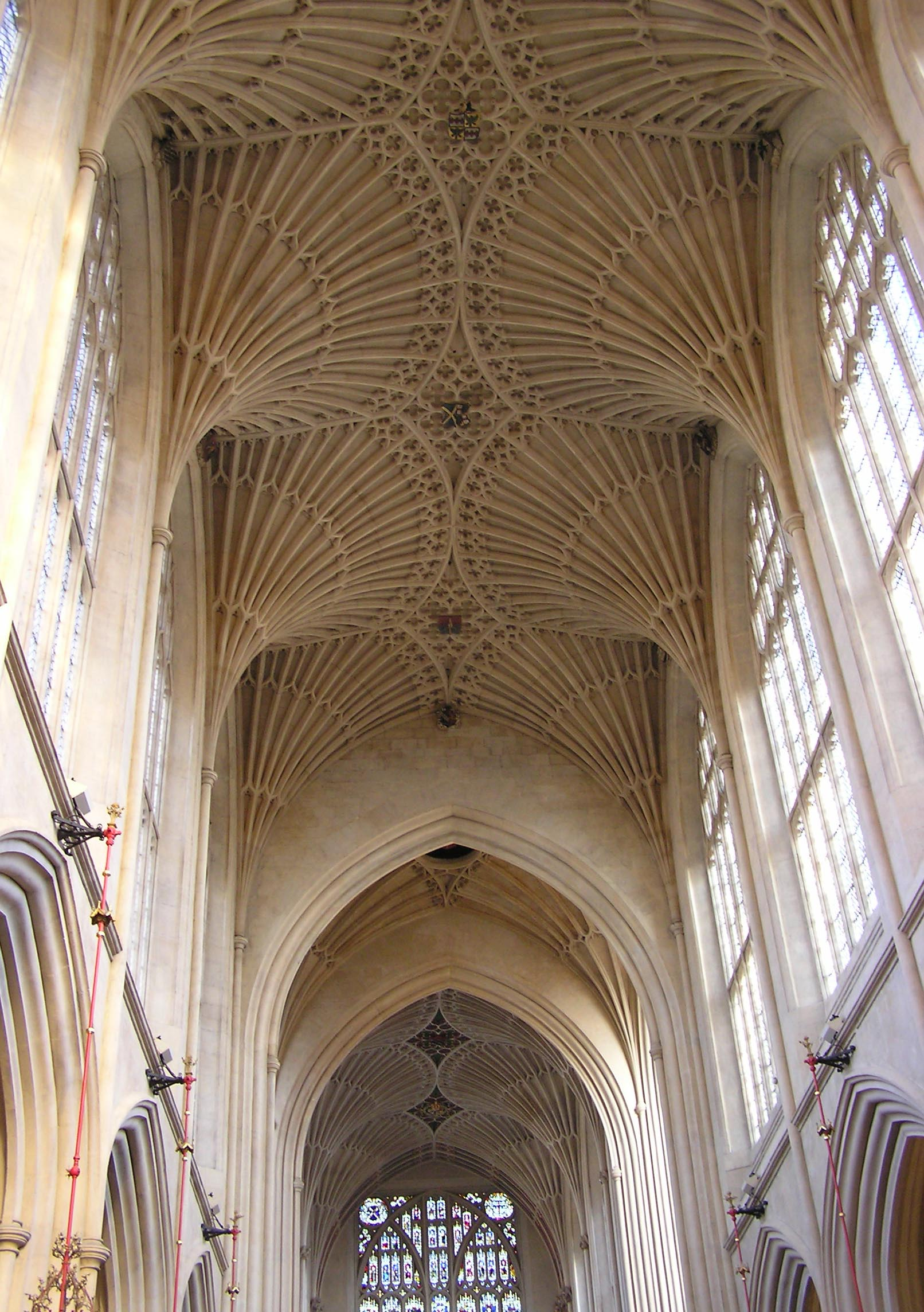
Late Gothic fan vaulting (1608, restored 1860s) over the nave at Bath Abbey, Bath, England. Suppression of the triforium offers a greater expanse of clerestory windows.

The earliest churches were built when builders were familiar with the form of the Roman basilica, a public building for business transactions. It had a wide central area, with aisles separated by columns, and with windows near the ceiling. Old St. Peter's Basilica in Rome is an early church which had this form. It was built in the 4th century on the orders of Roman emperor Constantine I, and replaced in the 16th century.

The nave, the main body of the building, is the section set apart for the laity, while the chancel is reserved for the clergy. In medieval churches the nave was separated from the chancel by the rood screen; these, being elaborately decorated, were notable features in European churches from the 14th to the mid-16th century.

Medieval naves were divided into bays, the repetition of form giving an effect of great length; and the vertical element of the nave was emphasized. During the Renaissance, in place of dramatic effects there were more balanced proportions.

By the 1300s, the maintenance and decoration of the nave of parish churches was the responsibility of the parishioners; the clergy were responsible for keeping the chancel in repair.

== Record-holders ==
- Longest nave in the world is in Spain: Basílica de la Santa Cruz del Valle de los Caídos, 262 m (860 ft) total; divided via added partition to not exceed that of St. Peter's in Rome
- Longest nave in Denmark: Aarhus Cathedral, 93 m (305 ft)
- Longest nave in England: Winchester Cathedral, 170 m (560 ft)
- Longest nave in Ireland: St Patrick's Cathedral, Dublin, 91 m (299 ft), externally
- Longest nave in France: Bourges Cathedral, 91 m (299 ft), including choir where a crossing would be if there were transepts
- Longest nave in Germany: Cologne Cathedral, 58 m (190 ft), including two bays between the towers
- Longest nave in Italy: St Peter's Basilica in Vatican City, 91 m (299 ft), in four bays
- Longest cathedral nave in Spain: Seville, 60 m (200 ft), in five bays
- Longest nave in the United States: Cathedral of St. John the Divine, New York City, United States (Episcopal), 70 m (230 ft)
- Highest vaulted nave: Beauvais Cathedral, France, 48 m (157 ft), but only one bay of the nave was actually built; however, choir and transepts were completed to the same height.
- Highest completed nave: St. Peter's Basilica, Vatican City, 46 m (151 ft)

== Gallery ==
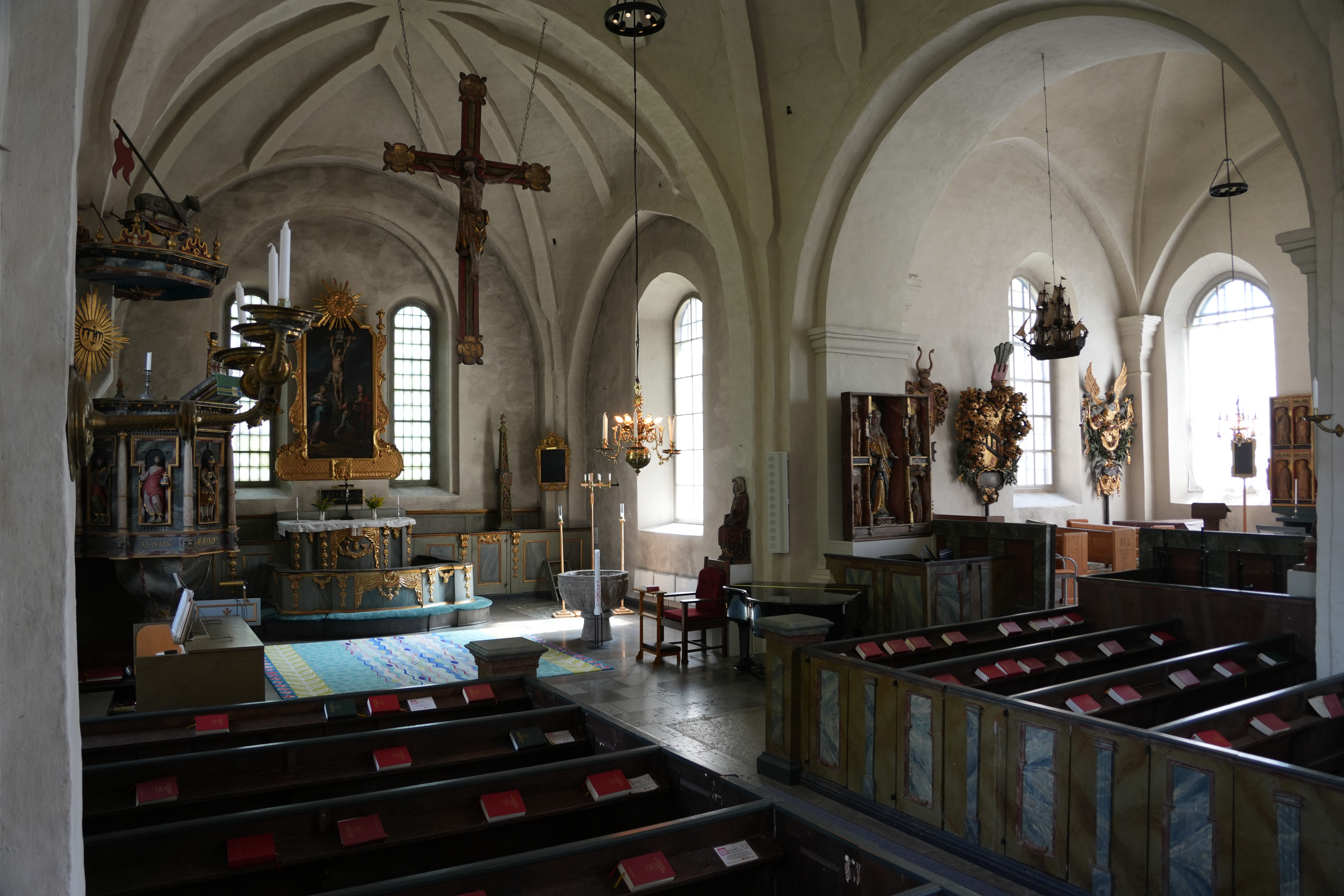
The nave of Frötuna Church (Evangelical-Lutheran) in Norrtälje, Sweden

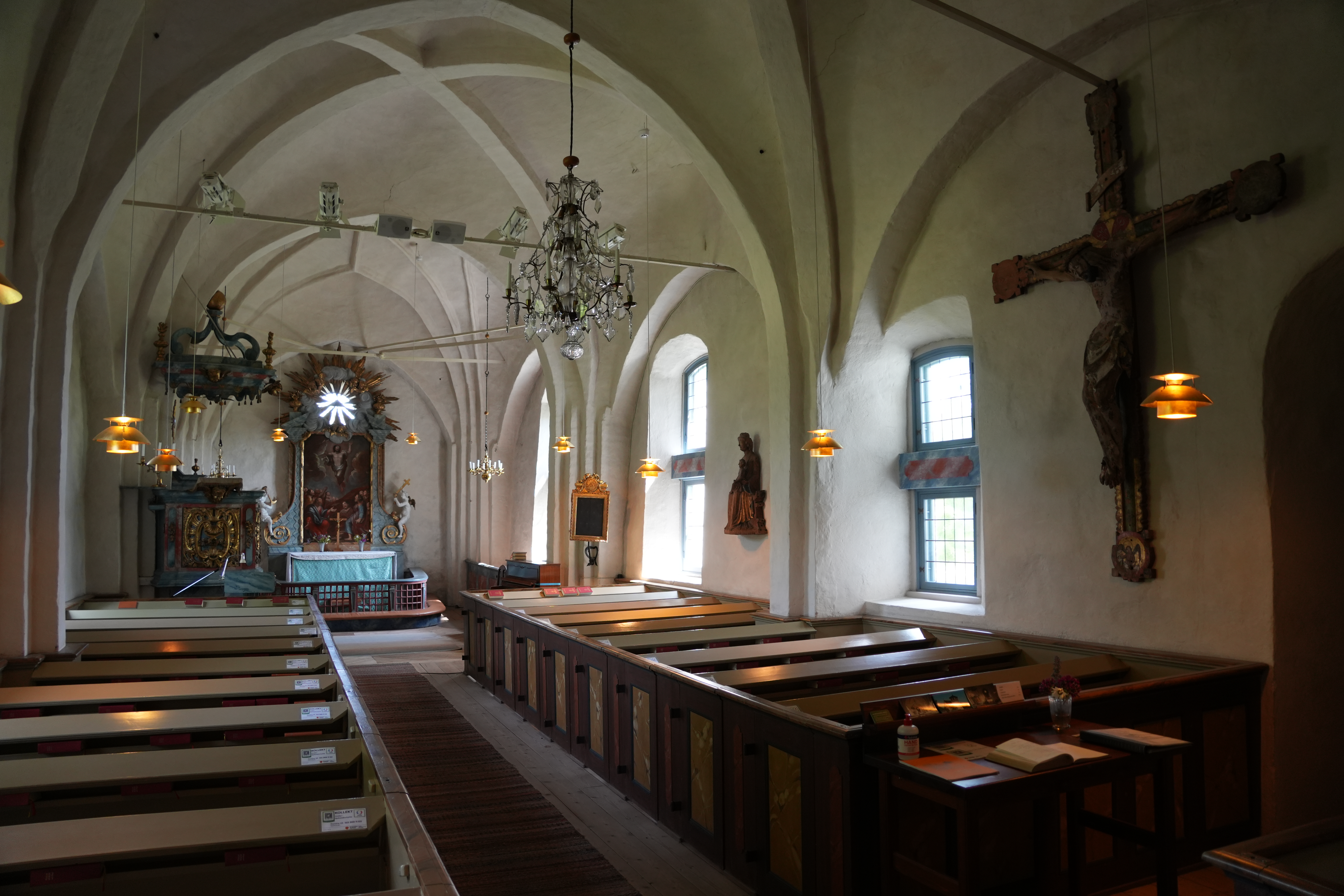
The nave of Husby-Sjuhundra Church (Evangelical-Lutheran) in Norrtälje, Sweden

== See also ==
- Abbey, with architectural discussion and ground plans
- Cathedral architecture
- Cathedral diagram
- List of highest church naves
