= Frötuna Church =

Church building in Norrtälje Municipality, Sweden

Coordinates: 59°44′29″N 18°40′30″E

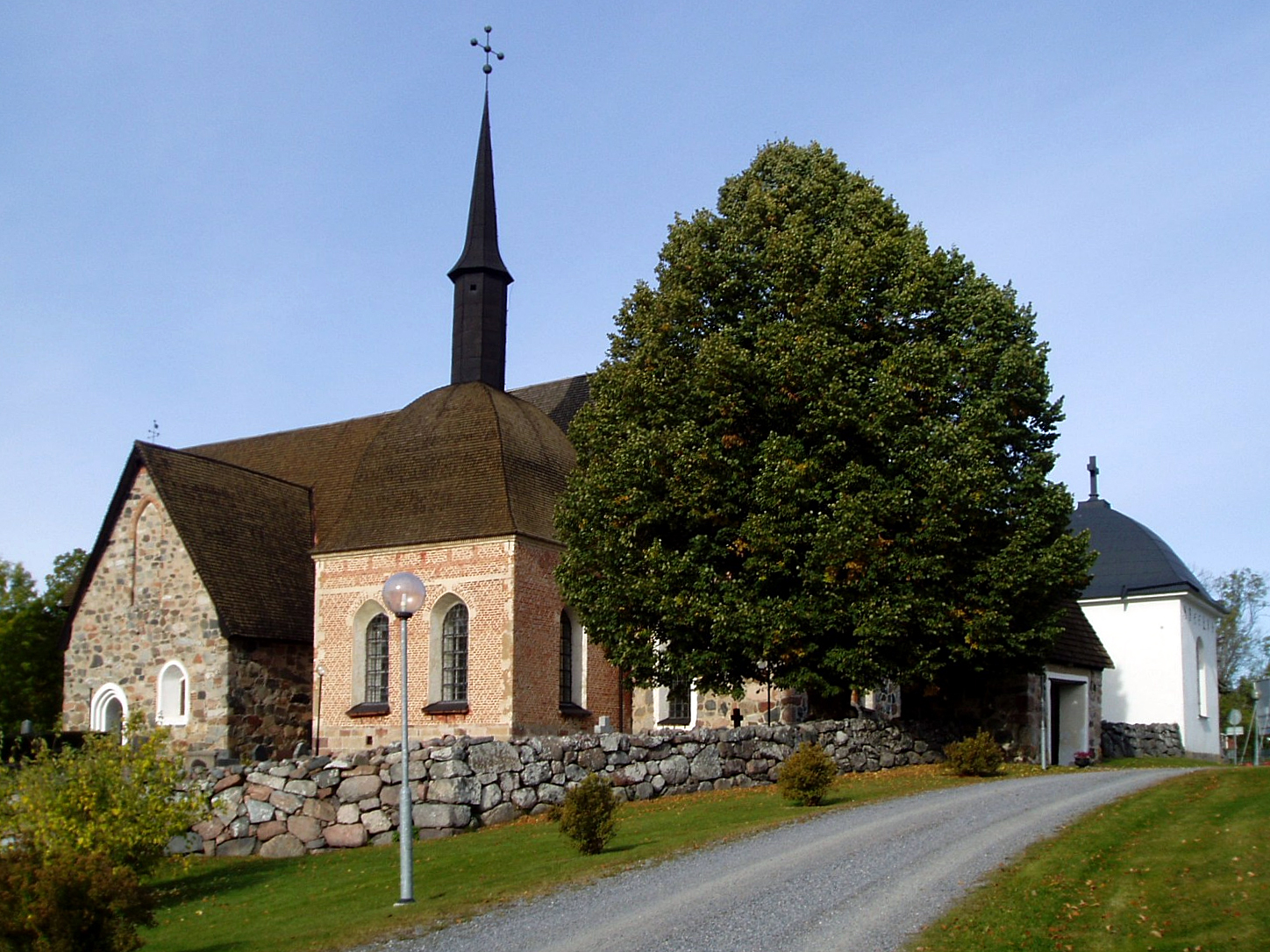
Frötuna Church, external view

Frötuna Church (Swedish: Frötuna kyrka) is a medieval Lutheran church in the Archdiocese of Uppsala close to Norrtälje in Stockholm County, Sweden.

== History and architecture ==
The oldest part of the church is from the late 12th century. The church was expanded during the 13th century and internal brick vaults were added in the 15th. The western part of the church was built as a defensive tower, to protect the congregation against raiders who came from across the Baltic Sea. A chapel was also added to the church during this time, which scholars believe may have been built for Sten Sture the Elder. The statesman was for a time excommunicated and thus disallowed from being present in church, but not from a chapel. The coat of arms of Sten Sture the Elder and his wife Ingeborg Tott are depicted in the ceiling of the chapel. The church was originally dedicated to Saint Olaf and during the Middle Ages there was a local guild named after the Norwegian saint in the parish.

During the 17th century a burial chapel was added to the south side of the church. It was commissioned by the Swedish nobleman Casper Otto Sperling, lord of nearby Rådmansö island and Ösbyholm manor. An external belfry was erected in 1812.

Among the church furnishings, the triumphal cross and the baptismal font are from the 13th century. A medieval polychrome wooden sculpture depicting the patron saint of the church, Saint Olaf, formerly belonged to the church but is today on display at the Swedish History Museum in Stockholm; a copy is displayed in Frötuna Church. The altar dates from 1773 and was made by a carpenter from nearby Norrtälje.
