= List of church murals in Sweden =

This is a list of church murals in Sweden which are also referred to as ceiling paintings, wall paintings or sometimes church frescos. In Swedish, they are usually called kalkmålningar (lime paintings) takmålningar (ceiling paintings) or väggmålningar (wall paintings).

The list is far from complete. Please feel free to add to it, either with new entries or additional details in regard to the existing entries.

== The list ==
Name	Location	Dates and comments	Coordinates	Image	Refs
Ala Church	Gotland	13th & 15th centuries	57°25′08″N 18°38′07″E		
Anderslöv Church	Scania	c. 1347 by the Snårestad Master	55°26′16″N 13°18′56″E		
Almunge Church	Uppland	15th century by Albertus Pictor	59°51′59″N 18°04′06″E		
Alva Church	Gotland	15th century	57°12′27″N 18°21′41″E		
Anga Church	Gotland	13th & 15th centuries	57°28′49″N 18°42′23″E		
Bäl Church	Gotland		57°38′41″N 18°37′58″E		
Barlingbo Church	Gotland	13th & 14th centuries	57°33′52″N 18°27′47″E		
Bjäresjö Church	Scania	13th & 14th centuries	55°27′44″N 13°45′00″E		
Boge Church	Gotland	13th & 15th centuries, the later in the style of the Master of the Passion of Christ	57°41′13″N 18°45′46″E		
Bollerup Church	Tomelilla Municipality, Scania	1476 on Barbara Brahe's return from Italy	55°29′33″N 14°02′51″E		
Bro Church	Gotland	Medieval	57°40′12″N 18°28′29″E		
Bromma Church	Stockholm	c. 1480	59°21′16″N 17°55′14″E		
Brunnby Church	Höganäs, Scania	c. 1480 with Barbaras Brahe's support	56°15′33″N 12°34′25″E		
Bunge Church	Gotland	Late 14th – early 15th century (anonymous Bohemian or Prussian master)	57°51′13″N 19°01′24″E		
Buttle Church	Gotland	15th century, by the Master of the Passion of Christ or his workshop	57°24′09″N 18°31′48″E		
Danmark Church	Uppland	Late medieval, by Albertus Pictor and Johannes Rosenrod	57°49′58″N 17°44′42″E		
Dalhem Church	Gotland	14th century and 1899-1914	57°33′08″N 18°32′02″E		
Eke Church	Gotland	13th & 15th centuries	57°10′04″N 18°22′45″E		
Ekeby Church	Gotland	13th, 14th (Master of the Passion of Christ), 17th & 19th centuries	57°35′42″N 18°30′42″E		
Enåker Church	Uppland	15th & 16th centuries, some by the Tierp group	60°02′06″N 16°47′59″E		
Etelhem Church	Gotland	14th & 15th centuries	57°20′14″N 18°29′45″E		
Everlöv Church	Blentarp, Scania	c. 1500 by the Everlövs Master	55°36′31″N 13°35′24″E		
Färlöv Church	Scania	15th century	56°04′26″N 14°04′59″E		
Farstorp Church	Scania	Late 15th century	56°16′37″N 13°47′48″E		
Finja Church	Scania	Mid-12th century	56°09′30.7″N 13°41′00.9″E		
Fjälkinge Church	Scania	1475-1500	56°02′15″N 14°16′40″E		
Fjelie Church	Scania	13th, 14th and 15th centuries	55°43′38″N 13°06′17″E		
Fröjel Church	Gotland	Early 14th century	57°20′08″N 18°11′23″E		
Fulltofta Church	Scania	Late 15th century	55°52′38″N 13°37′07″E		
Ganthem Church	Gotland	15th century	57°30′52″N 18°35′54″E		
Garde Church	Gotland	c. 1200 by an anonymous, probably Russian artist	57°19′01″N 18°34′55″E		
Gökhem Church	Blentarp, Scania	15th century by Master Amund	58°10′25″N 13°24′27″E		
Gothem Church	Gotland	c. 1300 by an anonymous, probably German artist	57°34′31″N 18°44′06″E		
Grönby Church	Scania	Second half of the 13th century	55°26′35″N 13°21′20″E		
Grötlingbo Church	Gotland	14th century	57°08′01″N 18°20′47″E		
Gualöv Church	Scania	Late 12th century and 1470s.	56°02′53″N 14°24′29″E		
Halla Church	Gotland	15th & 16th century	57°30′39″N 18°29′50″E		
Härkeberga Church	Uppland	1480s by Albertus Pictor	59°41′34″N 17°11′16″E		
Häverö Church	Uppland	15th century in the style of Albertus Pictor	60°02′28″N 18°40′48″E		
Hejdeby Church	Gotland	13th & 15th centuries	57°37′49″N 18°26′34″E		
Hemse Church	Gotland	14th & 15th centuries	57°13′58″N 18°22′22″E		
Hällestad Church	Scania	1460s	55°40′39″N 13°25′14″E		
Jumkil Church	Uppland	15th century	59°56′33″N 17°25′24″E		
Kågeröd Church	Scania	Late 15th century	56°00′01″N 12°05′20″E		
Knislinge Church	Scania	Romanesque and 1460–61	56°11′29″N 14°05′06″E		
Konga Church	Scania	Early 16th century	55°58′43″N 13°11′58″E		
Köpinge Church	Scania	1460s	55°56′18″N 14°09′29″E		
Kräklingbo Church	Gotland	Early 13th century	57°26′42″N 18°42′40″E		
Kvistofta Church	Scania	Medieval	55°58′09″N 12°49′45″E		
Lagga Church	Uppland	15th century in the style of Albertus Pictor	59°47′48″N 17°50′24″E		
Långaröd Church	Scania	15th century	55°47′16″N 13°50′17″E		
Lärbro Church	Gotland	Medieval	57°47′13″N 18°47′37″E		
Linde Church	Gotland	15th century	57°16′46″N 18°22′47″E		
Linderöd Church	Scania	1498 by Anders Johansson	55°56′15″N 13°49′24″E		
Listlena Church	Uppland	15th century	59°39′48″N 17°16′02″E		
Lau Church	Gotland	1520	57°16′58″N 18°37′12″E		
Lojsta Church	Gotland	Mid-13th century to c. 1520	57°18′46″N 18°23′03″E		
Lummelunda Church	Gotland	13th, 15th centuries and 17th centuries	57°46′11″N 18°27′19″E		
Lye Church	Gotland	14th and 15th centuries	57°17′52″N 18°31′34″E		
Lyngsjö Church	Scania	12th and 14th century	55°56′07″N 14°04′16″E		
Mariakyrkan	Båstad, Scania	15th & 16th centuries, various painters	56°26′00″N 12°50′08″E		
Maglehem Church	Scania	1470s	55°46′22″N 14°09′11″E		
Markim Church	Uppland	15th century	59°36′19″N 18°03′00″E		
St. Mary's Church, Ystad	Ystad, Scania	13th century	56°25′45″N 13°49′07″E		
Nederluleå Church	Gammelstaden, Norrbotten	15th century by a pupil of Albertus Pictor	65°38′44″N 22°01′41″E		
Norrvidinge Church	Scania	13th, 14th and 15th centuries	55°50′18″N 13°05′51″E		
Öja Church	Gotland	13th and 15th centuries	57°02′07″N 18°18′00″E		
Östra Hoby Church	Borrby, Scania	13th, 15th and 16th centuries, including Åle workshop	59°28′19″N 14°13′53″E		
Överselö Church	Strängnäs, Södermanland	mid-15th century	59°25′08″N 17°07′52″E		
St. Peter's Church, Malmö	Malmö, Scania	Early 16th century	55°36′25″N 13°00′13″E		
Rasbokil Church	Uppland	c. 1500	59°59′34″N 17°51′37″E		
Rö Church	Uppland	15th century	59°41′48″N 18°23′20″E		
Roslags-Bro Church	Uppland	15th century, largely decorative	59°49′47″N 18°44′13″E		
Sånga Church	Uppland	c. 1470	59°21′29″N 17°42′27″E		
Södra Råda Old Church	Gullspång, Västra Götaland	1323 & 1494, destroyed by fire 2001	59°00′14″N 14°12′15″E		
Skånela Church	Uppland	15th century	59°34′52″N 17°56′56″E		
Stenkyrka Church	Gotland	13th and 14th centuries	57°29′08″N 18°31′14″E		
Sundre Church	Gotland	Medieval	56°56′09″N 18°10′53″E		
Täby Church	Uppland	1470s by Albertus Pictor	59°29′27″N 18°03′24″E		
Tensta Church	Uppland	1473 (by Johannes Rosenrod), 1480s, 16th century. Includes the first deliberate portrait in Swedish art.	60°02′26″N 17°40′18″E		
Torshälla Church	Södermanland	15th century attributed to by Albertus Pictor	59°25′19″N 16°28′06″E		
Vä Church	Scania	12th century, possibly the oldest in Sweden	55°59′30″N 14°05′13″E		
Vaksala Church	Uppland	14th to 16th centuries, some probably by Albertus Pictor	59°52′33″N 17°41′11″E		
Vamlingbo Church	Gotland	Second half of the 13th century	56°58′10″N 18°13′49″E		
Yttergran Church	Uppland	14th & 15th century (Albertus Pictor)	56°36′05″N 17°30′17″E		
