= Pehr Philander =

Swedish gardener and former slave

Johan Pehr Gustav Philander
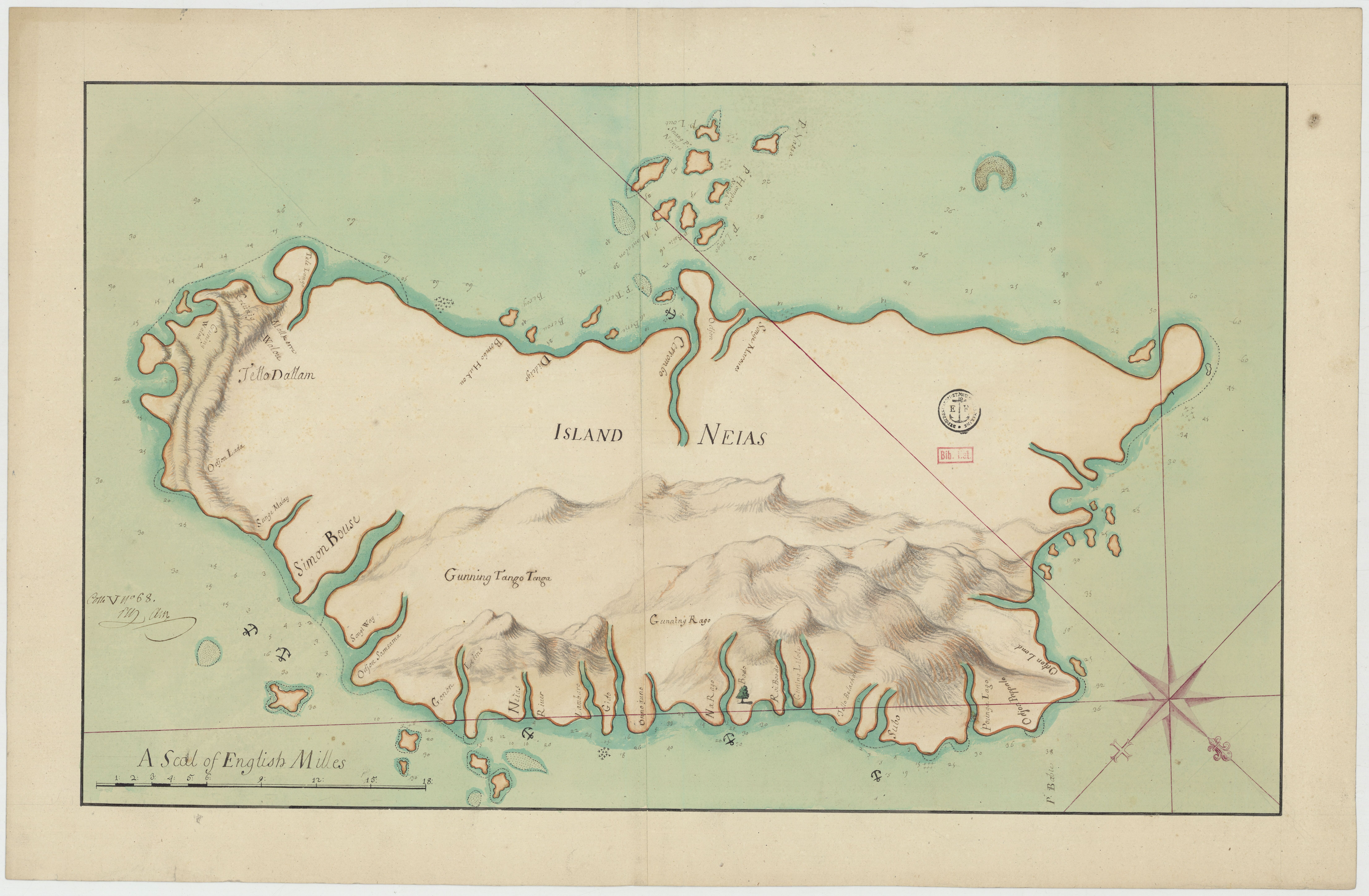
- 18th century map of Nias
- Born: 1758; Nias (Note: Officially, his birthplace was reported as Java.)
- Died: 27 February 1811 (aged 52–53); Strängnäs, Sweden
- Occupation: Gardener
- Spouses: Anna Kajsa Svensdotter (m. 1779; died 1803) Catharina Stenholm (m. 1807)
- Children: 5
- Father: Carl Gustaf Ekeberg (Adoptive)

Johan Pehr Gustav Philander (Note: He received the name Johan Pehr Gustav Philander at his baptism in Sweden, his birthname is unknown.), also known as Javanen (The Javan in Swedish) was a gardener and former Dutch slave from the island of Nias. He was bought in Canton and adopted by Carl Gustaf Ekeberg, who took him to Sweden, where he became free, slavery having no legality in Sweden.

== Early life and enslavement ==
Pehr Philander was born in 1758 on the island of Nias off the coast of Sumatra. At a young age, Philander was kidnapped and enslaved by members of the Dutch East India Company. Along with two other boys, he was brought by the Dutch to Canton in China.

The boys were brought to a market in Canton where they were being sold as "three Malay-boys". The Dutch supposedly nailed the boys' earlobes to the ships' chests, which meant that Philander carried a scar on his ear for the rest of his life. In 1766, the boys were spotted by the crew of the ship Stockholms slott, while on their Second octroi under the Swedish East India Company. Philander was bought by Carl Gustaf Ekeberg for 1800 Copper coins, the other two boys were bought by the supercargoers. Shortly after the purchase, one of the two supercargoers, Anders Gadd, died, and his goods were to be sold, the profits going to his family. The crew of the ship got together and paid for the boy Gadd had bought, so that he would avoid going to the slave market a second time.

The two other boys were given the names Johan Gustaf Agorander (Note: Some newspapers in Sweden interviewed descendants of Johan Gustaf Agorander where he was sometimes mistaken as being an Amerindian from Lima or an African.) and Ludvig Ulric Javander upon their arrival in Sweden.

== Life in Sweden ==
Philander was brought along with the cargo to Uppsala. Upon his arrival, he was automatically free, since slavery in Sweden had been outlawed since 1335. He was adopted by Ekeberg and grew up along his other children in Tensta. Philander was baptized on the 15 October 1769 in the Tensta Church where he was given his Swedish name. He had an unusually ambitious baptism, with at least 14 godparents including the governor of Uppsala, Counts, Barons and a Vicer, perhaps because it was considered significant to baptize a "heathen". Since people in Sweden had not heard of Sumatra, let alone Nias, he became known as Javanen (The Javan).

On the seventh November 1779, he married Anna Kajsa Svensdotter who was pregnant and gave birth three months after the wedding. They moved around a lot and ended up in the Strängnäs area where he worked as a gardener. The croft they lived on is now known as Java.

Anna died in 1803, and Philander remarried in 1807 to Catharina Stenholm. After Philander died in 1811, his family ended up in the poorhouse. Philander was buried in an unmarked grave at Strängnäs Cathedral.

== See also ==
- List of slaves
- Slavery in Sweden
- Gustav Badin
- Joseph Pierce
