= Carl Gustaf Ekeberg =

Swedish explorer (1716–1784)

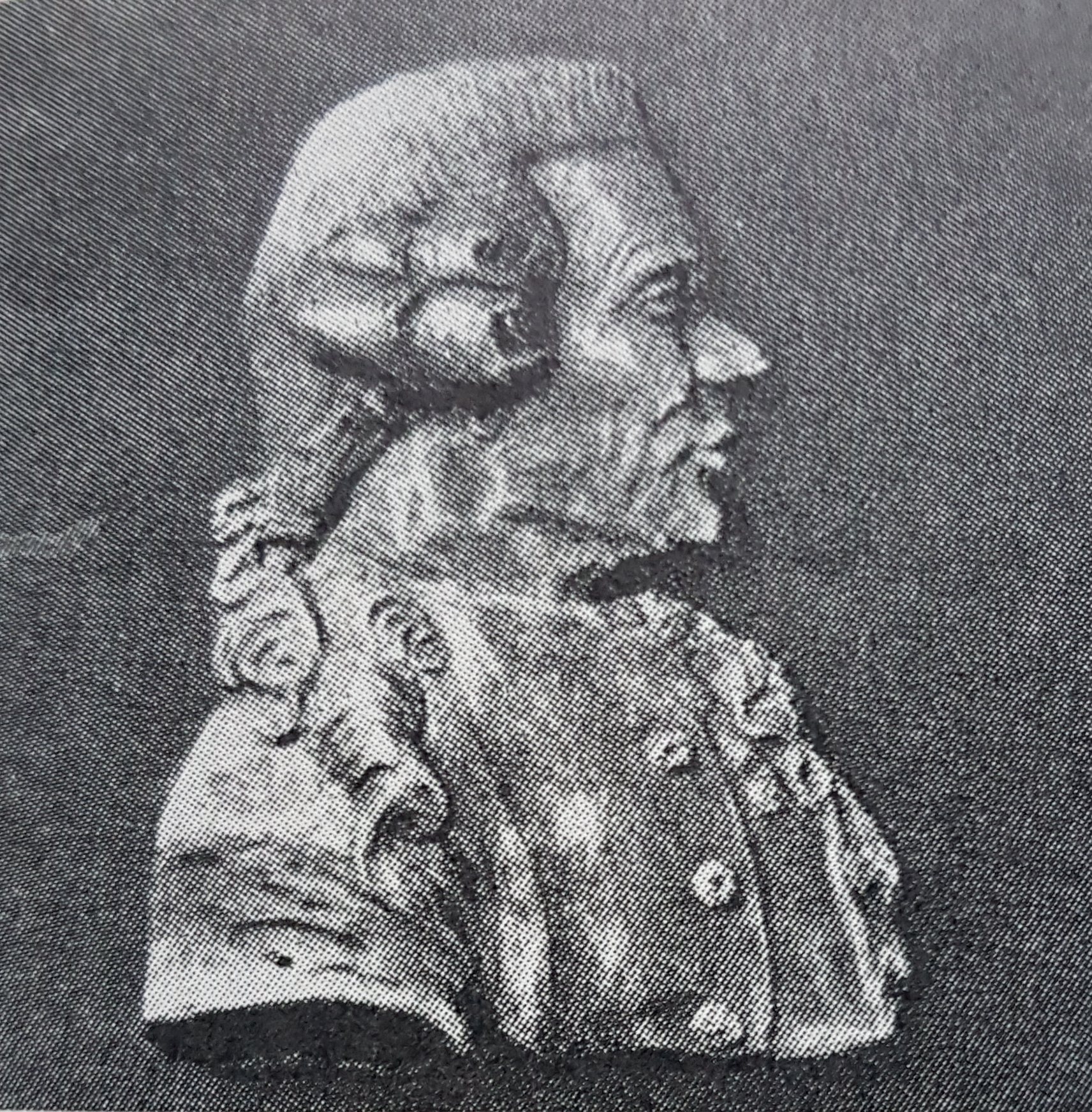
Carl Gustaf Ekeberg

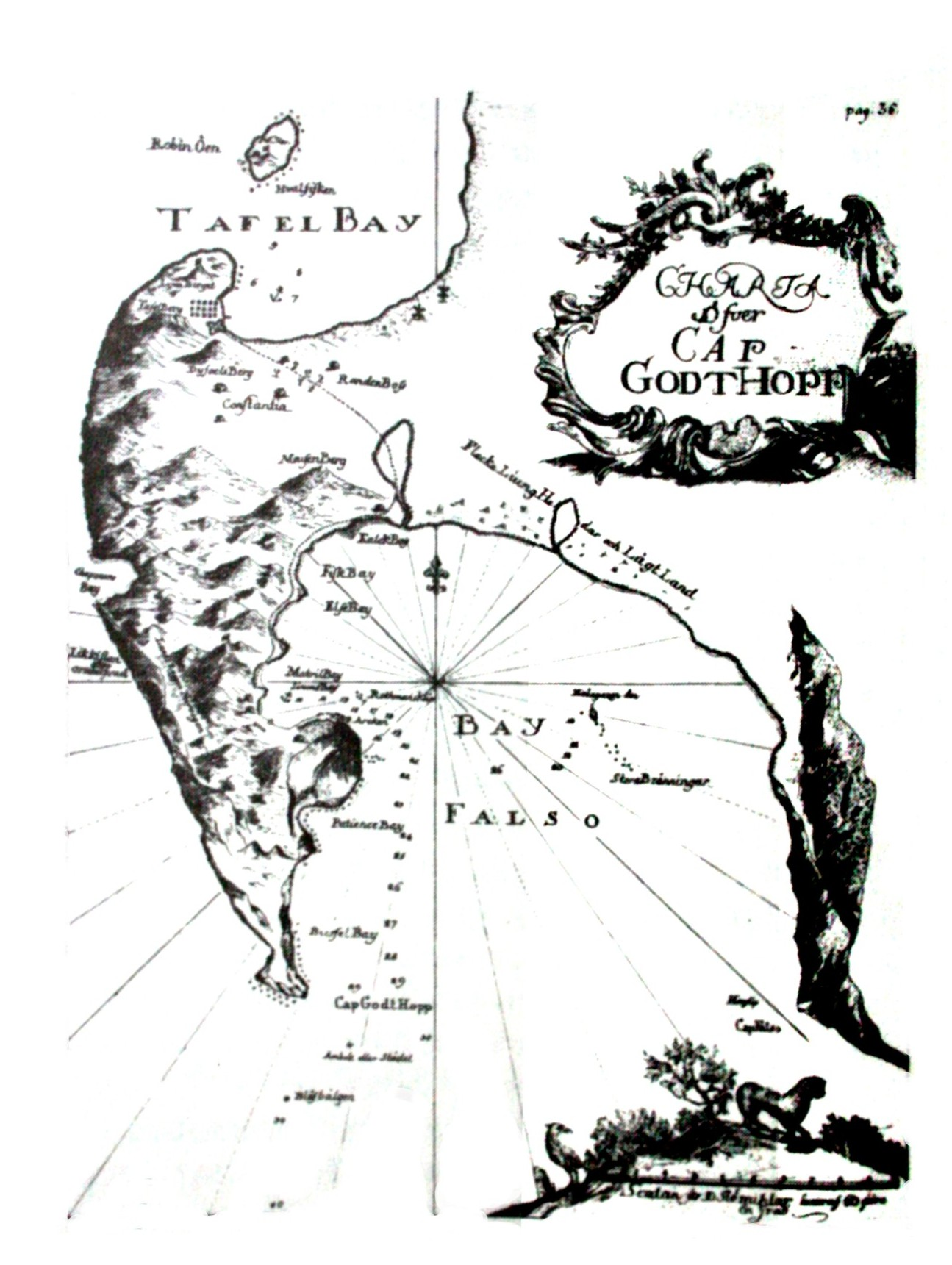
Map of False Bay from Ostindiska Resa

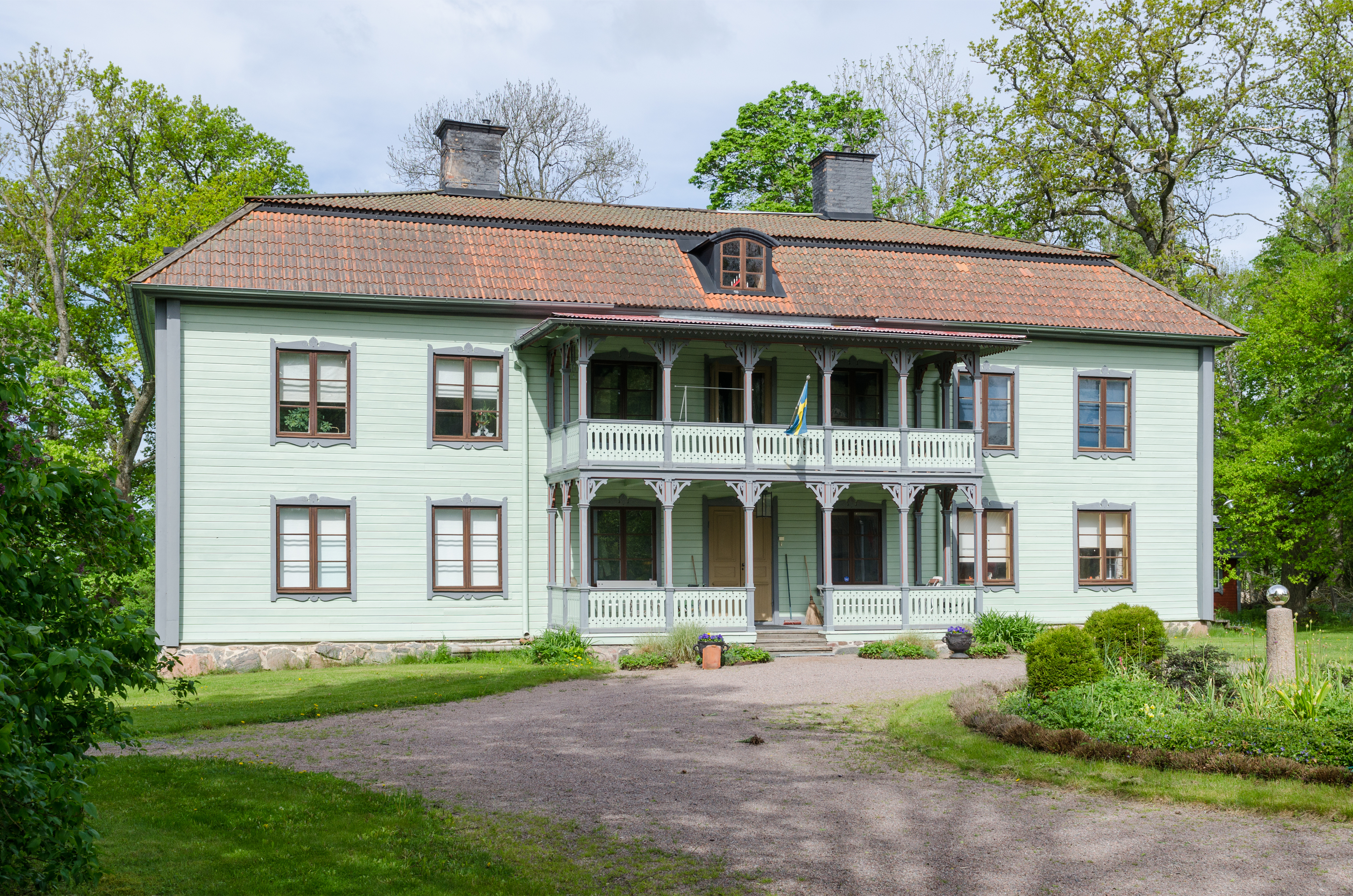
Altomta gård at Tensta

Carl Gustaf Ekeberg (10 June 1716 – 4 April 1784) was a Swedish physician, chemist and explorer. He made several voyages to the East Indies and China as a sea captain. He brought back reports of the tea tree and wrote a number of books.

== Biography ==
Ekeberg was born at Djursholm in Uppland, Sweden. He was the son of Gustaf Ekeberg and Catharina Ebba Fast. He was a student at Uppsala University for three years (1726–1729); pharmacy student at Västerås (1730–1736); provisor in the pharmacy at Turku (1737–1738).

Trained as a pharmacist and chemist, Ekeberg started his career as a ship's doctor, and became an expert navigator. Between 1742 and 1778 he made ten trips to India and China, becoming a captain in 1750 for the Swedish East India Company. He brought back numerous natural history specimens from his voyages for Carl Linnaeus, with whom he had a close friendship.

Swedish ships from 1750 avoided calling at Cape Town, preferring to reprovision in Madagascar and St. Helena. Ekeberg though, was on good terms with the Cape governor, Rijk Tulbagh, and called on him when visiting the Cape. He was an excellent cartographer, compiling good maps of the coastlines along which he sailed, publishing them in his book Ostindisk Resa 1770-71 (Stockholm 1773).

Ekeberg was also responsible for having Anders Erikson Sparrman, whom he had met on a voyage to Canton in 1765, sent to the Cape in 1772 to take up a tutoring post.

He was elected a member of the Royal Swedish Academy of Sciences in 1761. He was elected a Fellow of the Swedish Academy of Science in Stockholm and a Knight of the Order of Vasa in 1777.

In 1779, he was honoured by the naming of a genera of plants from Africa, Ekebergia, which contains 4 species of plant.

== Personal life ==
In 1744, he married Hedvig Erlant (1719-1809). At the beginning of the 1760s, Ekeberg purchased three farms which he brought together to form Altomta gård in the parish of Tensta. Ekeberg adopted a boy whom was named Pehr Philander from the island Nias that he bought at a market in Canton. He died during 1784 at Altomta. He was buried at Tensta Church (Tensta kyrka) in Uppsala County, Sweden.

== Selected works ==
- Voyages aux Grandes-Indes dans les années 1770 et 1771 (Ostindisk Resa 1770-71), Stockholm, 1773
- Moyen facile d'inoculer la petite vérole, écrit qui popularisa la pratique de l'inoculation
