= Brunnby Church =

- Brunnby kyrka
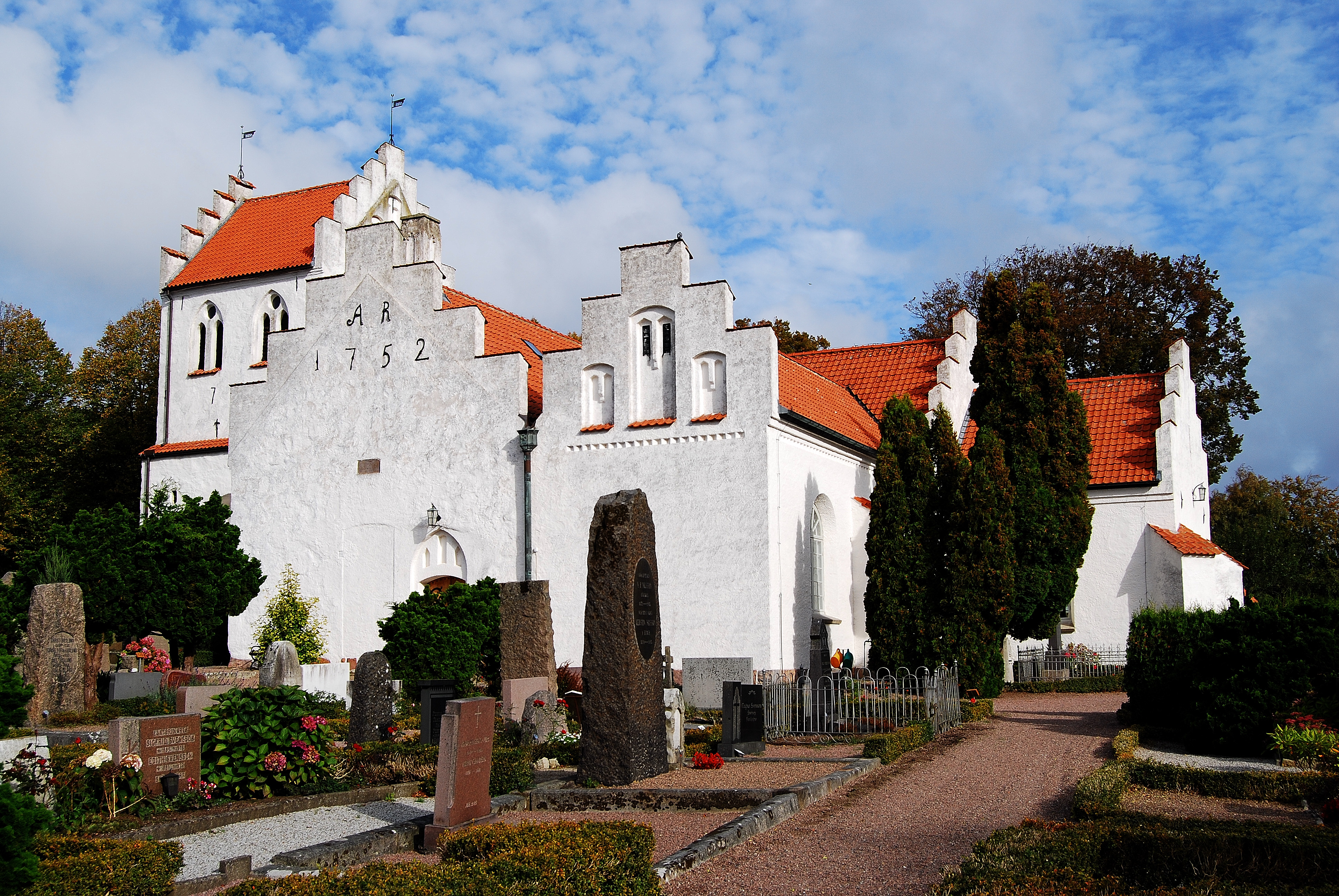
- Brunnby Church

- 56°15′33″N 12°34′24″E
- Country: Sweden
- Denomination: Church of Sweden

Administration
- Diocese: Lund

Brunnby Church (Swedish: Brunnby kyrka) is a medieval Lutheran church about 9 km (5.6 mi) north of Höganäs in southern Sweden. It belongs to the Diocese of Lund. The church is noted for its many 15th-century murals, attributed to the Helsingborg Workshop.

== History and architecture ==
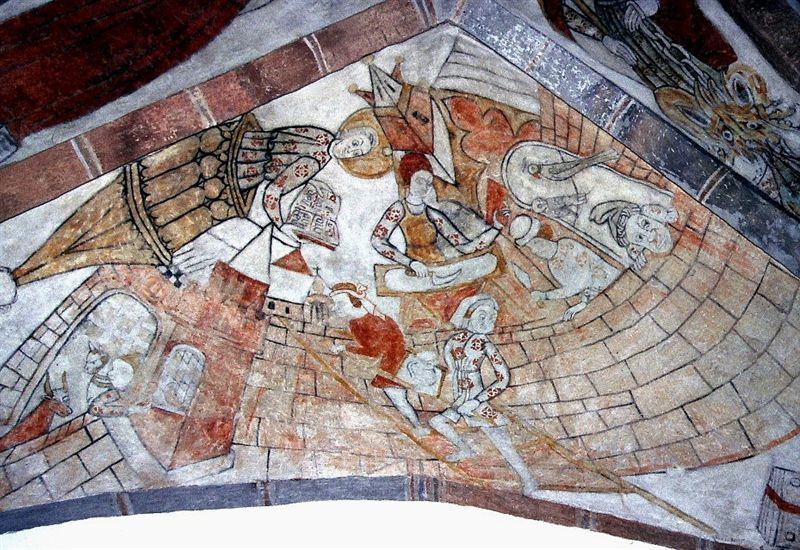
Nave mural of St Andrew preaching in Patras

Brunnby takes its name from the spring about 200 m (660 ft) south of the church. Built in the Romanesque style in the mid-12th century, the church initially consisted of a chancel and nave. Two small windows survive from this period. In the 15th century, the church was extended towards the west in the Gothic style, the tower was added and the ceilings were vaulted. The north arm of the transept known as Arild's Chapel was probably added at the beginning of the 16th century, while the south arm or Mölle Chapel was completed in 1752. In 1752, the porch was replaced by the other arm of the transept. In 1912, Theodor Wåhlin redesigned the transept. A new chancel was added, and the old chancel was converted into a sacristy.

== Interior ==
The Renaissance pulpit bears Christian IV's monogram and the date of 1623. The altarpiece from 1873 presents a copy by Nils Månsson Madelgren of an Emmaus painting by the Danish artist Adam August Müller. In the south transept, there are epitaphs to Erik Sinius (died 1743) and his family as well as an earlier altarpiece from 1732. The carved baptismal font is from 1895. The Madonna in the chancel is probably North-German from the mid-15th century which previously stood in the 13th-century chapel in Arild. The 14th-century crucifix which used to hang on the chancel arch is now in the Lund Museum.

== Murals ==
The church is noted for its medieval murals from the second half of the 15th century. Some fragments of those added around 1450 can be seen on the walls of the nave, but in 1480, Barbara Brahe had vaults constructed and decorated with murals. It is thought these rich decorations might have been painted by artists from the Helsingborg Workshop, who also painted the murals in St Mary's Church (Sankta Maria kyrka)in Helsingborg. As the church was consecrated to Saint Andrew, his image appears in a number of the paintings.

== See also ==
- List of church murals in Sweden
