= Anderslöv Church =

- Anderslövs kyrka
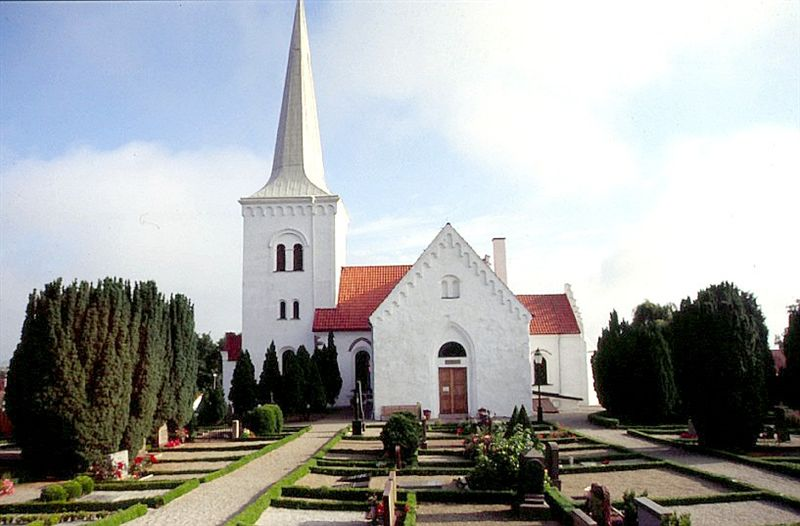
- Anderslöv Church

- Location within Skåne Location within Sweden
- 55°26′16″N 13°18′56″E
- Country: Sweden
- Denomination: Church of Sweden

Administration
- Diocese: Lund

Anderslöv Church (Swedish: Anderslövs kyrka) is a medieval Lutheran church built in the Romanesque style. Located in the village of Anderslöv, some 11 km (7 mi) southeast of Svedala in southern Sweden, it belongs to the Diocese of Lund. The church is noted for the medieval paintings which decorate its vaulted ceiling.

== History and architecture ==
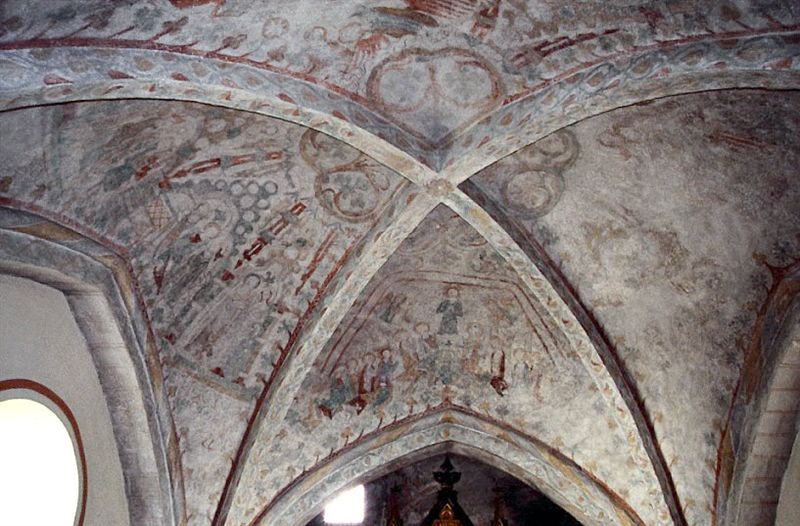
Paintings on the chancel vault

The church and the nearby spring have associations with Saint Andrew but linguists believe the name is probably related to the Old Norse Andor. The half-rounded apse, chancel and the wider nave were built of granite, flint, sandstone and limestone in the mid-12th century. The corners and borders are decorated with sculpted sandstone. There are traces of the original north and south doors. Above the former south door, the remains of a pointed-arch window can be seen. The tower probably dates to the 13th century while its pointed spire was first mentioned in 1756. As a result of a fire in 1869 which seriously damaged the tower, the spire was rebuilt in 1871. The south arm of the transept was completed in 1767, the northern arm in 1841.

== Interior ==
The pulpit from the early 17th century is possibly the work of Jakob Kremberg from Lund. The reliefs in the panels depict the Nativity, the Crucifixion, the Resurrection and the Ascension. The pulpit originally had five panels: the fifth, depicting the Easter scene, is now hanging beside it. The four Evangelists and Saint Peter can be seen on the pulpit's corners. Traces of the original altar can be seen in the south transept. Today's altarpiece, created by Henrik Sjöström, is recent. A new organ has recently been installed in the gallery in the south transept.

== Murals ==
The vaults in the chancel and nave date from the mid-14th century. The murals which decorate them are attributed to the Snårestad Workshop whose work in the now demolished Snårestad Church was dated to 1347. After being whitewashed over in the 18th century, they were revealed by Hans Erlandsson in 1929.

In the apse vault, Christ in a mandorla can be seen judging the world surrounded by the sun, moon and stars. In the chancel, Christ is seen rising at the Ascension with images of Mary and the Apostles. The nave vaulting presents fragments of the Annunciation and the Nativity, the shepherds, the Adoration of the Magi and Mary with the infant Jesus. There are also images of the Last Judgment with Christ sitting on a rainbow.

== See also ==
- List of church murals in Sweden
