= Konga Church =

- Konga kyrka
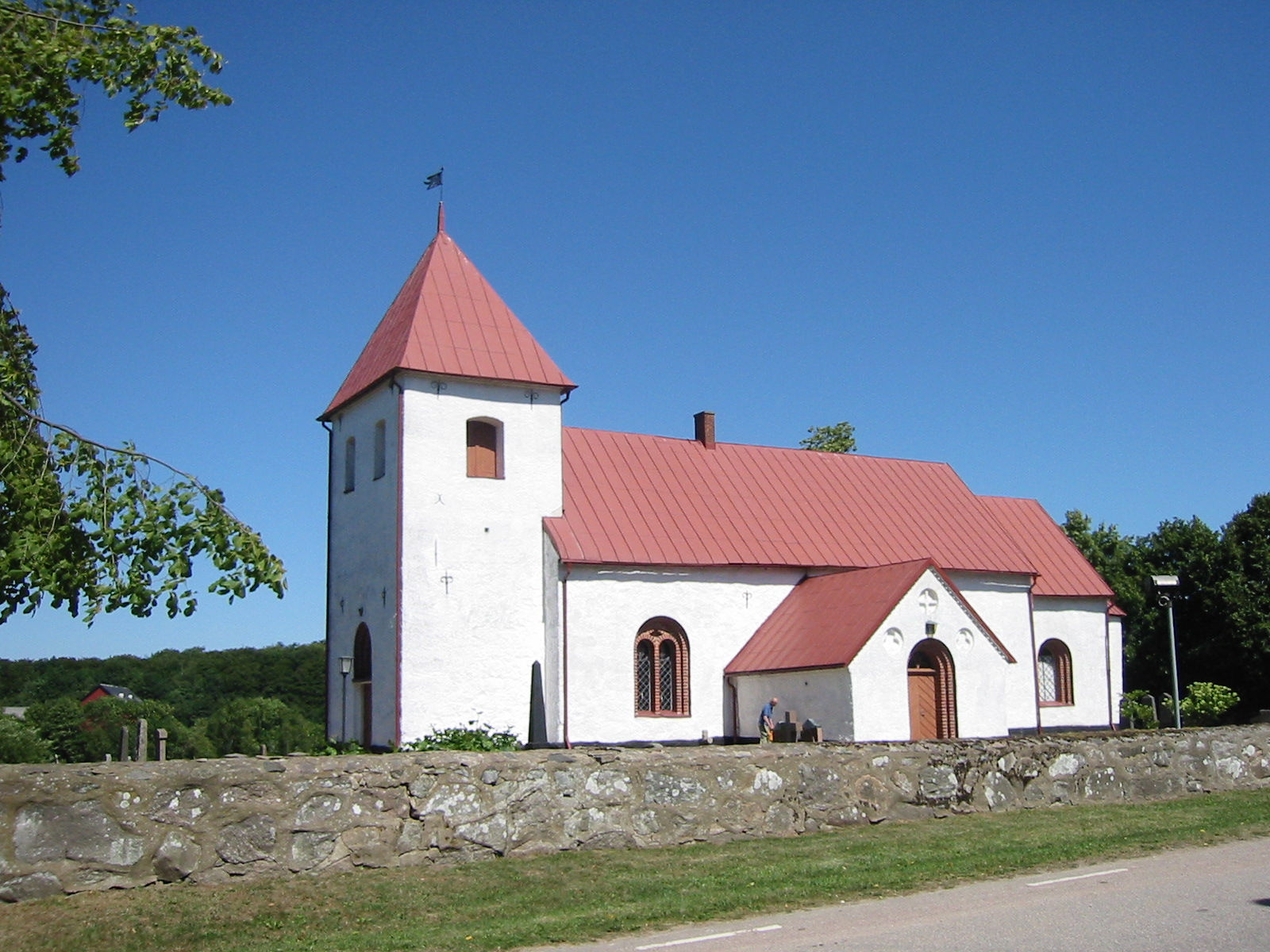
- Konga Church

- 55°58′43″N 13°11′58″E
- Country: Sweden
- Denomination: Church of Sweden

Konga Church (Swedish: Konga kyrka) is a medieval church in Konga (Svalöv Municipality) in the province of Scania, Sweden. It was built at the end of the 12th century, somewhat rebuilt at the end of the Middle Ages and from the late 18th century onward underwent several changes. A large renovation was carried out 1910–1911.

The church contains several historic furnishings, including a baptismal font from the 12th or 13th century and an altarpiece from the period 1697–1718. In addition, it is decorated with several late medieval murals. Some of these are purely ornamental, but others vividly depict scenes from the life of Jesus.

== History ==
Konga Church was built at the end of the 12th century. It originally consisted of a nave, chancel and an apse. During the second half of the 15th century, the interior was remade and the church equipped with vaults. During the late Middle Ages a church porch was also added in front of the southern entrance. The nave was enlarged in 1794, and two years later the current church tower was built. Further changes were made during the 19th century, when the floor was replaced, the vault of the apse rebuilt, and a western entrance added. A larger renovation was carried out 1909–1910, directed by architect Theodor Wåhlin. During this time the medieval murals were rediscovered and uncovered.

== Architecture and furnishings ==
The church is built of fieldstone. The altar dates from the 1909–1910 renovation, but the altarpiece is from the period 1697–1718. The baptismal font is the oldest item in the church, dating from the 12th or 13th century. The pulpit is originally from the late 17th century, but has been repaired and rebuilt several times since. The church also has a medieval oil lamp, dating from the 14th century and made of iron.

== Murals ==
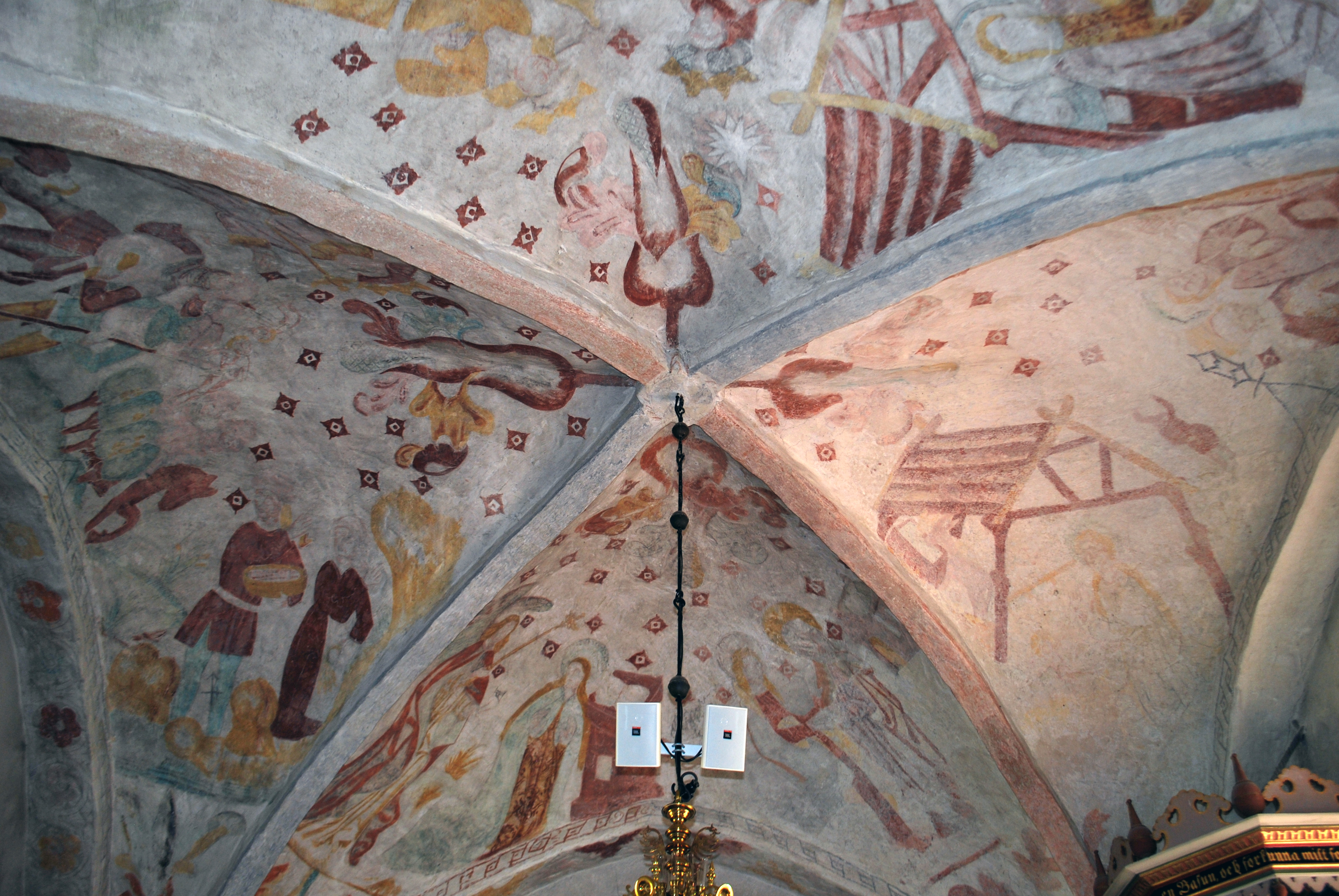
Late medieval murals

The church contains a few fragments of Romanesque murals. It also has a set of purely decorative murals from the 15th century, and notably rich murals from the early 16th century. The latter contain depictions of the Annunciation, the Annunciation to the shepherds, the birth and circumcision of Jesus, as well as the Adoration of the Magi, the Massacre of the Innocents, and an extra-biblical legend about the Flight into Egypt.

== See also ==
- Church murals in Sweden
- Church frescos in Denmark
