= Häverö Church =

Coordinates: 60°02′28″N 18°40′48″E

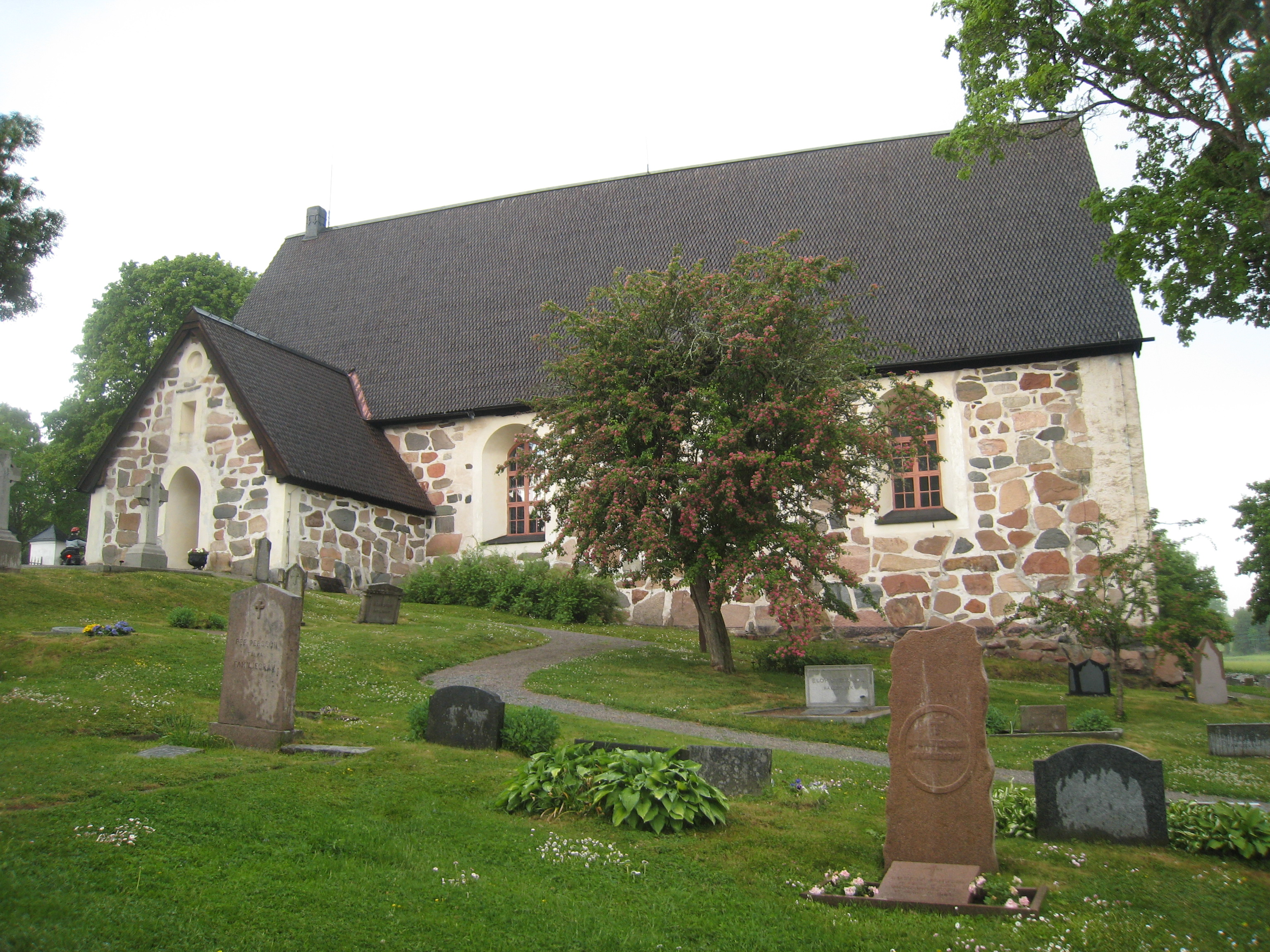
Häverö Church, external view

Häverö Church (Swedish: Häverö kyrka) is a medieval Lutheran church in the Archdiocese of Uppsala in Stockholm County, Sweden.

== History and architecture ==
Häverö Church was erected circa 1300, and the oldest parts are the nave and vestry. The church is made of grey and pink granite blocks, with details in brick. The vestry was probably built first, possibly originally attached to a now vanished stave church. The church porch is only somewhat later. During the 15th century the church received internal brick vaults, which have been richly decorated by frescos in the style of Albertus Pictor. Among the vivid scenes is the first known depiction of a nyckelharpa, traditionally a popular instrument in Uppland province, and a singing choir.

Among the church furnishings, the altarpiece is especially noteworthy. It was made in Antwerp during the early 16th century. The church also houses three sculptured wooden saints, one of which depicts Bridget of Sweden. The baptismal font is older than the church and may have belonged to the original stave church; it dates from the 13th century.

The wooden bell tower of the church is one of the oldest in Sweden and the oldest of its kind in Stockholm County. It dates from the 16th century, but the external covering is later, from the 18th century.

The church windows were enlarged during the 18th century, and renovations of the church have been carried out in 1905 and 1972.
