= Rö Church =

Coordinates: 59°41′48″N 18°23′20″E

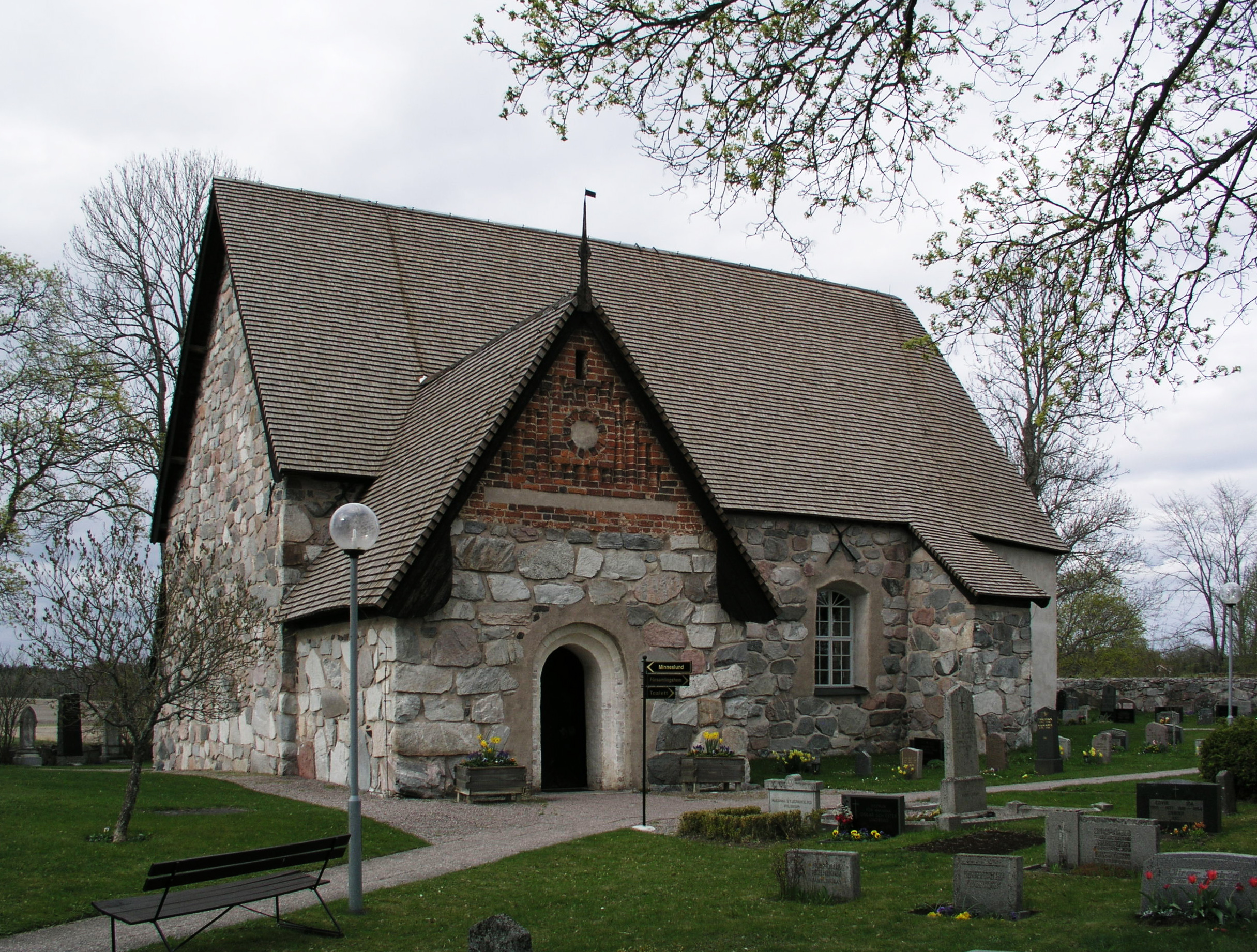
Rö Church, external view

Rö Church (Swedish: Rö kyrka) is a medieval Lutheran church in the Archdiocese of Uppsala in Stockholm County, Sweden.

== History ==
The first church on the site was probably a wooden church. It was replaced with the presently visible stone church during the second half of the 13th century, dedicated to Saint Olaf. Technical details indicate that the masons may have come from Gotland. The church received internal brick vaults circa 1475, decorated with frescos. The church was damaged by fire during the 16th or 17th century and in connection with the restoration, two rough buttresses were added externally. The church suffered a period of neglect during the 17th and early 18th centuries but was renovated in 1747, when the choir was rebuilt.

== Architecture ==
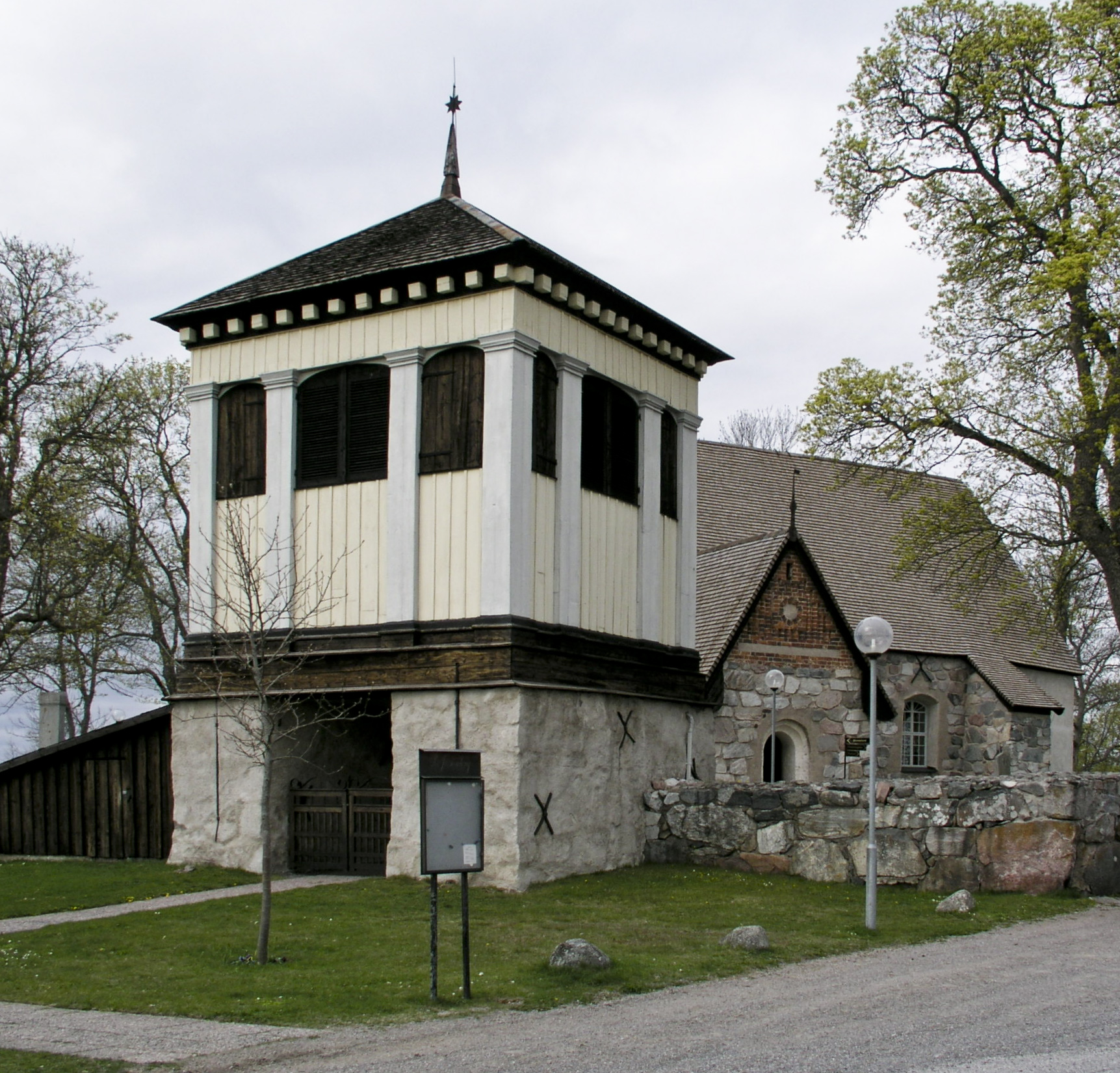
The combined entrance gate and bell tower

The church is a single-nave Gothic church built by roughly hewn stones and some details in brick. It retains much of its original medieval atmosphere despite later reconstructions. The interior is dominated by the decorated medieval brick vaults. The frescos date from the late 15th century and are made by an unknown artist in a style not represented in any other church nearby. They depict both traditional Christian imagery such as the Four Evangelists, the Final Judgement and saints (including the Nordic saints Saint Olaf, Saint Eric and Saint Bridget), but also a lively scene depicting the story of the grateful dead.

The church also houses some noteworthy furnishings. A Romanesque Madonna, the so-called Rö Madonna, is the most unusual. Dating from the end of the 12th century or early 13th, it most probably belonged to the first, wooden church. Its origins are unknown, and there are no stylistically comparable pieces of art in Sweden. It has been suggested that it may be an English work of art. The church furthermore houses an additional three medieval wooden sculptures, of Saint Olaf, Saint Eric and Saint Stephen. The triumphal cross is from the 15th century. Of later date is the unusual collection of church silver, including a unique set of bridal jewellery from the 18th century.

The entrance to the church cemetery is an unusual combination of lychgate and bell tower, erected in 1806-07. It houses two church bells, made in 1749 and 1791 respectively. There is also a burial chapel for the local aristocratic family Silverstolpe on the grounds.
