= Skånela Church =

Church in Sigtuna Municipality, Stockholm County, Sweden

Coordinates: 59°34′52″N 17°56′56″E

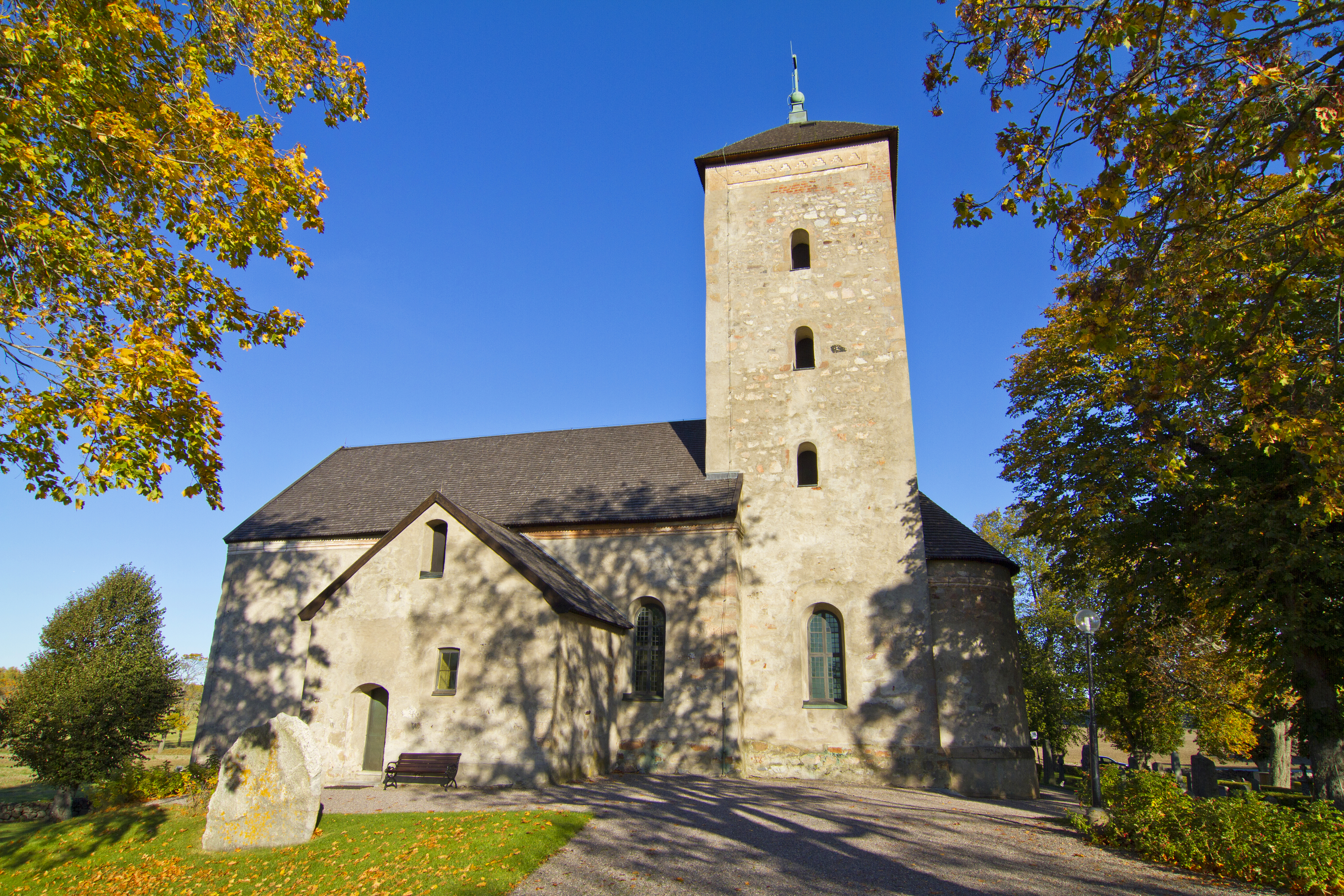
Skånela Church, external view

Skånela Church (Swedish: Skånela kyrka) is a medieval Lutheran church in the Archdiocese of Uppsala in Stockholm County, Sweden. It is one of the oldest churches in Stockholm County.

== History ==
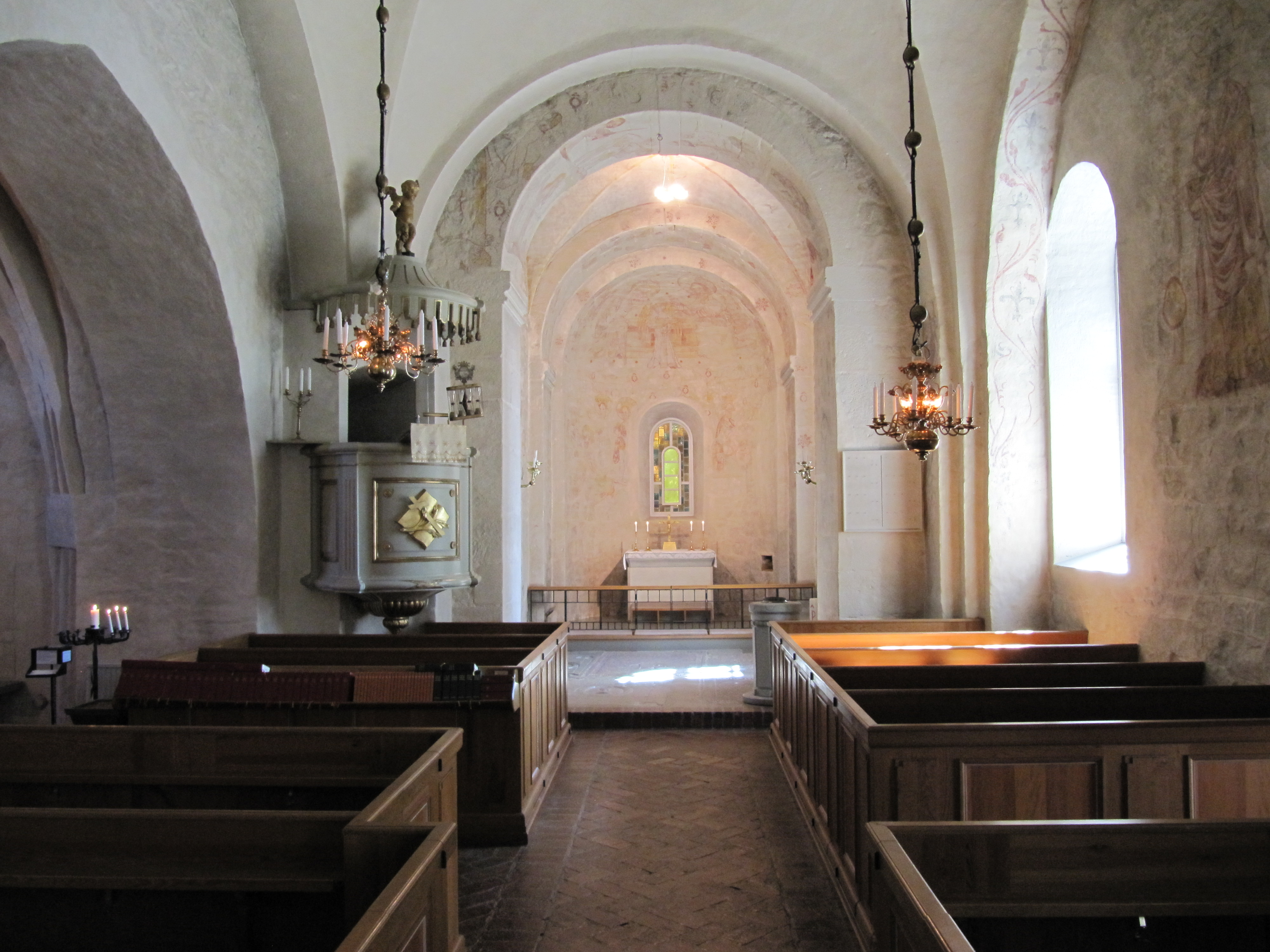
Interior view towards the apse

Skånela Church is one of the oldest churches in Stockholm County, erected in the 1160s, and located in a cultural landscape with ancient traditions. There are fifteen runestones located in and in the close vicinity of the church.

The architect may have come from nearby Sigtuna, or possibly Lund; both cities with considerable church building activity during this period. The architect was very probably educated abroad and may have come from present-day Germany. Skånela Church subsequently served as a model for later churches in the area, and its details show that considerable skill and effort was spent on its building. The church may have been erected by a local landowner, most probably the owner of nearby Skånelaholm Castle, who possibly fell out of favour with the ruler, Birger Jarl, as the church appears to have been confiscated and is later (1276) mentioned as being sold to the nearby Sko Abbey (today the parish church of Skokloster Castle).

The church was expanded in the 14th century, when a chapel and a vestry were added. In the 15th century the church was decorated internally with frescos depicting the Coronation of the Virgin. At the same time the tower was raised two storeys. During the 18th century, a burial chapel for the Swedish noble family Jennings was added. The church has been devastated by fire on at least two occasions, in 1642 and 1806, but still retains much of its medieval ambience.

== Architecture ==
The church is mostly Romanesque in appearance, and is unusually meticulously executed. For example, sandstone has been used for several details rather than the locally more commonly used granite, and other stones appear to have been carefully chosen. The exterior of the church is dominated by the tower, which unusually is situated at the eastern end of the church. There are only two other examples of churches with eastern towers in all of Uppland, all of them Romanesque. The apse and the southern portal are other Romanesque details which are still intact. Later additions to the exterior are in the Gothic style, while the large burial chapel for the Jennings family is from the 18th century. Some of the windows date from after 1806 and were remade following that year's fire.

Internally, the church received vaults during the 15th century and, at the same time, the aforementioned frescos. The church also has a few fragments of earlier frescos, discovered and laid bare during a renovation in 1957. The church houses a wooden carved Madonna covered in gold leaf, from the early 16th century.
