= Sundre Church =

- Sundre kyrka
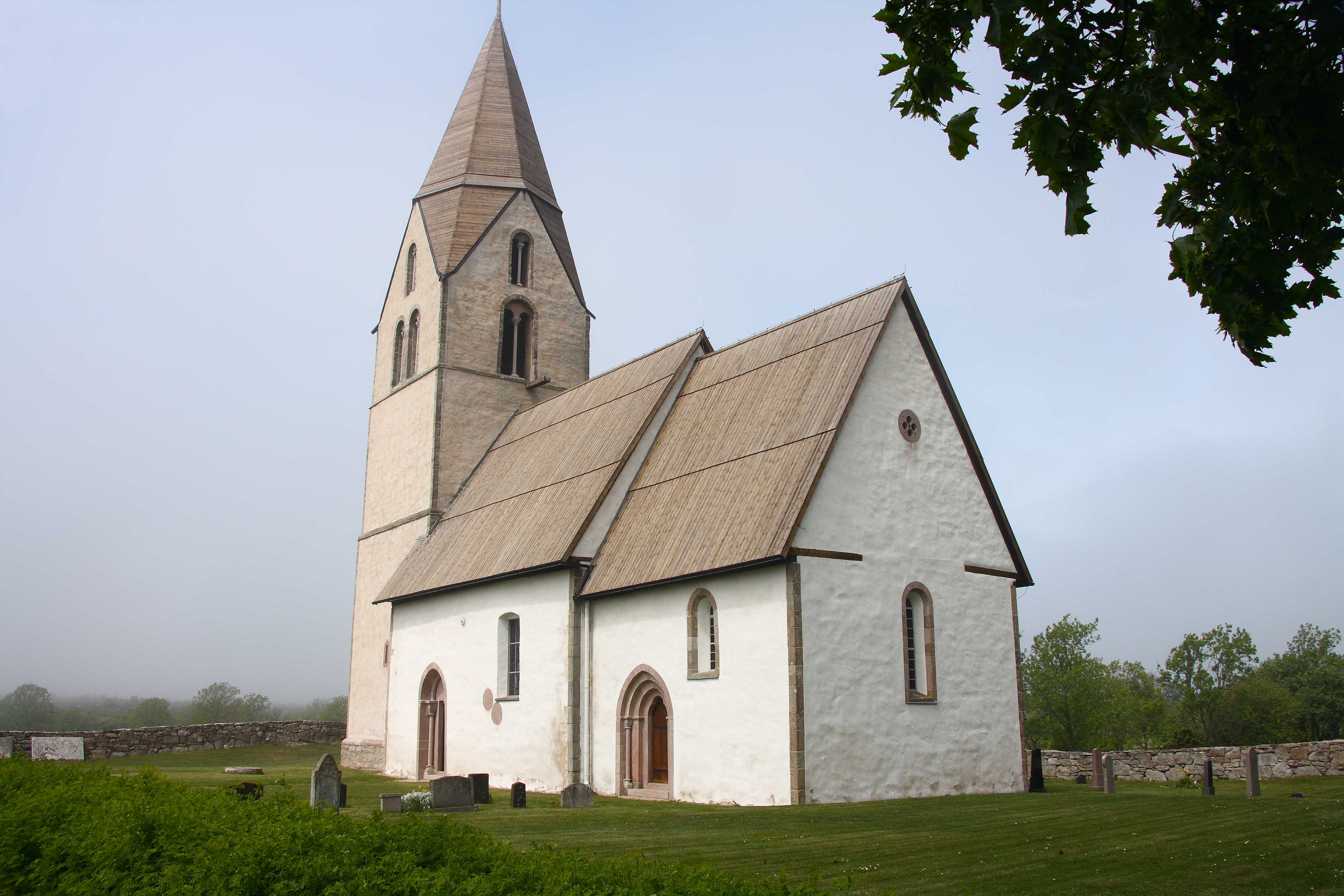
- Sundre Church, view of the exterior

- Location on Gotland
- 56°56′09″N 18°10′54″E
- Country: Sweden
- Denomination: Church of Sweden

Administration
- Diocese: Visby

Sundre Church (Swedish: Sundre kyrka) is a medieval church on the Swedish island of Gotland. It was built during the 13th century and has remained largely unaltered since. It lies in the Diocese of Visby.

== History ==
The church was originally built as the church for a large farmstead. This first church was wooden, and built during the early 12th century. A few painted remains of the church have been preserved at the Gotland Museum in Visby. They were painted by a Russian artist and the scene depicts the Last Judgement. It has been speculated whether the remains were originally parts of an iconostasis, given the Russian origin of the work, but more probably they are the remains of a ceiling.

The first church was torn down during the early 13th century and replaced by the presently visible stone church in Romanesque style. Before that, however, a defensive tower had been built near the church, the ruins of which are still standing. It probably served as a haven for the congregation in times of danger or war. The tower of the church was added in the middle of the 13th century.

No major alterations have been made to the church since the Middle Ages, except for the addition of the vestry. Restorations were carried out in 1931 and 1969-1970.

During a large part of its history, the church functioned as a navigational aid for sea-farers, as it is located on a height not far from the sea. It appears as such in a Dutch navigation book in 1627.

== Architecture ==
The church is built of local sandstone, except the entrance portals which are executed in more durable limestone. It is a relatively homogeneous Romanesque church. The interior of the church is decorated with a suite of medieval murals depicting the Passion of Christ. A few medieval wooden sculptures have also been preserved, including a triumphal cross from the 15th century. The perhaps most unusual piece from the church is an organ dating from 1370 and today also on display in the Museum of Gotland in Visby. According to an inscription in Latin, it was made by a master named Verner from Brandenburg. It depicts the coats of arms of what has been interpreted as the ten farms of the parish.

Near the church are the relatively well-preserved ruins of a circular defensive tower, dating from the early Middle Ages.
