= Fjelie Church =

- Fjelie kyrka
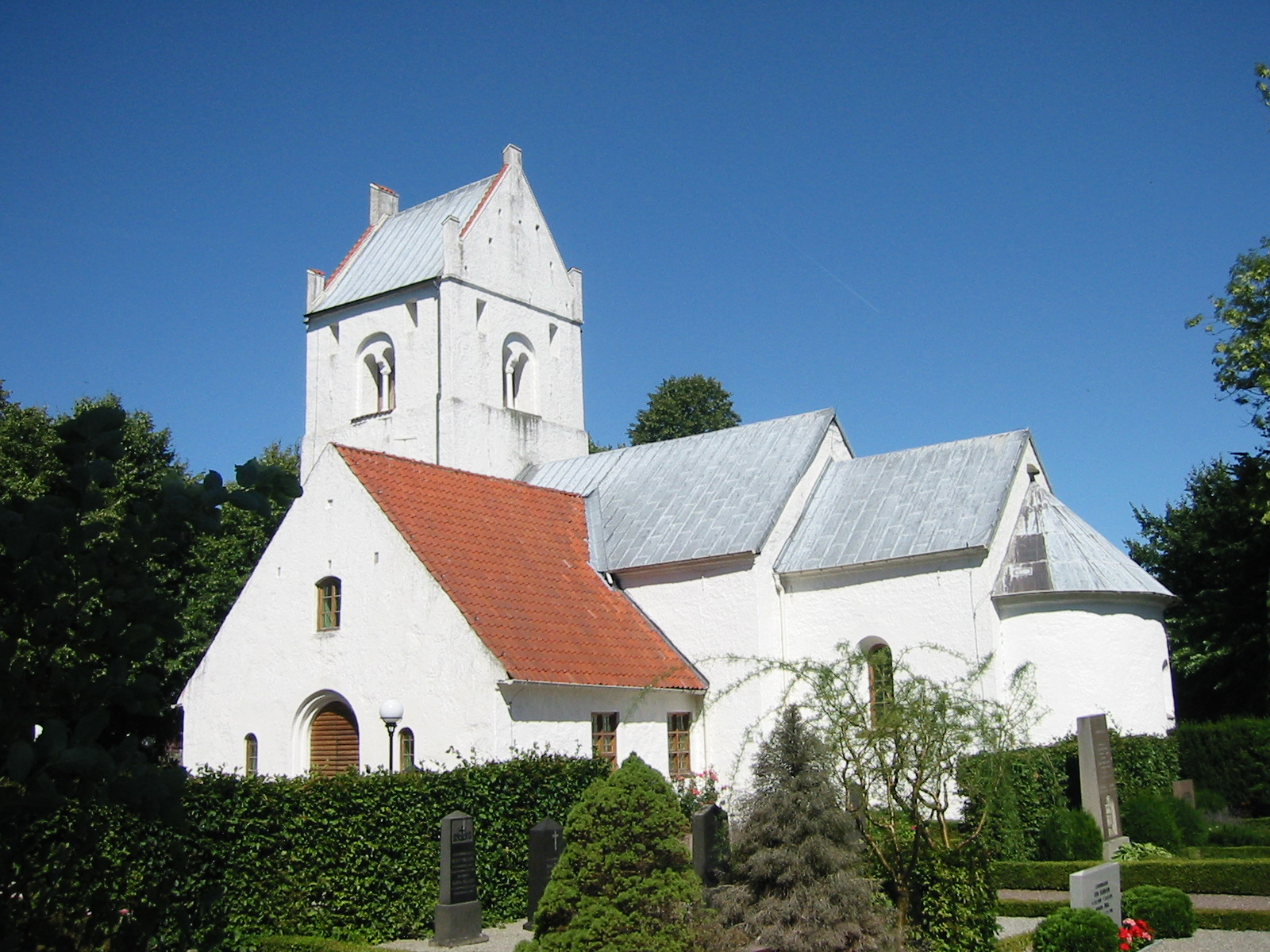
- Fjelie Church

- 55°43′38″N 13°06′17″E
- Country: Sweden
- Denomination: Church of Sweden

Administration
- Diocese: Lund

Fjelie Church (Swedish: Fjelie kyrka) is a medieval church in Fjelie, Lomma Municipality, Scania, Sweden. The church is decorated with church murals from the 13th, 14th and 15th centuries, and also contains medieval furnishings.

== History ==
The church was built sometime around 1120–1130. The nave, tower, chancel and apse are from this time. The church shows some similarities with Dalby Church and was probably commissioned by a local magnate. There are the remains of a western portal in Romanesque style in the west wall of the tower. The church was originally probably also equipped with a gallery floor above the entrance, where members of the local elite could participate in the celebration of Mass without having to mingle with the congregation. The interior of the church was rebuilt in the 14th century, when the present vaults were constructed. After the end of the Middle Ages some further changes have been made to the church. In the 1770s an extension was built to the north, and in 1802 the church was enlarged to the south. Both extensions may incorporated remains of medieval church porches. The church was thoroughly renovated in the 1940s, at which time medieval murals were also uncovered from under layers of whitewash.

== Murals and furnishings ==
The church contains several sets of medieval murals. The oldest are in the chancel, and date from the 13th century. These depict God the Father in the centre of the apse, holding Christ in his arms. Above him is a depiction of the Holy Ghost in the shape of a dove, and below is a row with Apostles. Elsewhere in the chancel there is a depiction of Saint Mary and Saint Martin. In the other parts of the church there murals from the 14th and 15th centuries, depicting i.a. scenes from both the Old and New Testament, Saint Peter and several female saints.

The oldest item in the church is the baptismal font, a decorated sandstone vessel from the second half of the 12th century. It is decorated with reliefs showing the life of Christ, including the Baptism of Christ. The church also possesses a rood cross from the 15th century. The decorated pulpit is from the 17th century and has depictions of the Four Evangelists on its sides. The church also contains an astronomical clock which was made by the priest of the church Emil Ahrent, who donated it to the church in 1946.

In the church cemetery there is also the grave of a British airman whose body was found on the nearby shore after his bomber had been shot down while on a mission to Germany in 1943.
