= Långaröd Church =

Church in Långaröd, Scania, Sweden

- Långaröds kyrka
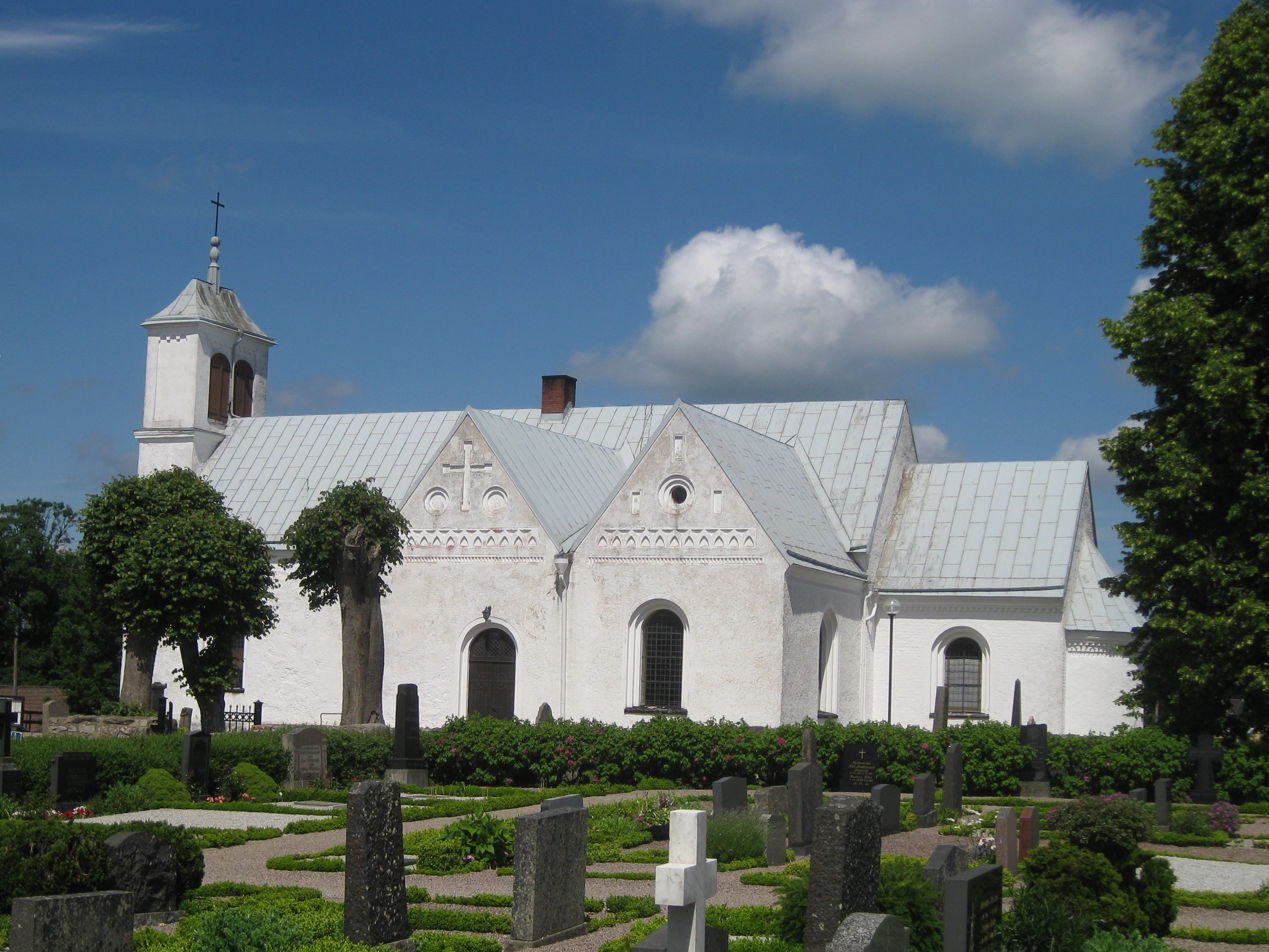
- Långaröd Church

- Location within Skåne Location within Sweden Location within Europe
- 55°47′16″N 13°50′17″E
- Country: Sweden
- Denomination: Church of Sweden

Långaröd Church (Swedish: Långaröds kyrka) is a medieval church in Långaröd, Scania, Sweden. It belongs to the Church of Sweden. Built in the 12th century, it is one of the oldest brick churches in the province. The church is decorated with murals from the 15th century.

== History ==
Erected at the end of the 12th century, with brick as the construction material, Långaröd Church is one of the oldest brick churches in Scania. It originally consisted of a nave and a chancel with an apse and was built in a Romanesque style; a single original window remains in the north wall. Towards the end of the Middle Ages a tower was added, which in turn was demolished and replaced with a new tower in the 1550s. In 1853 that tower was also demolished, and replaced with the present tower. A southern transept was also added in 1850, and the church was enlarged again in 1903. Inside, the church was equipped with vaults during the 15th century.

== Murals and furnishings ==
The chancel vaults are decorated with 15th-century murals, similar in style to those found in Vittskövle Church. They were exposed from under layers of whitewash in 1903, and subsequently damaged by soot from the heating system of the time. In 1938 they were cleaned, and in 1963 an attempt was made to restore them as close as possible to their original state. They depict, in the nave, scenes from the Book of Genesis, and in the chancel scenes from the life of Saint Nicholas.

Among the furnishings of the church, the baptismal font is the oldest, probably dating from c. 1200. The rood cross of the church is also medieval, dating from the 14th century. The two church bells are from 1587 and 1633, respectively. The pulpit dates from the 18th century and is in a late Baroque style. The altarpiece was made in 1755, possibly by Johan Ullberg, and contains a painting from 1593.
