= Grönby Church =

- Grönby kyrka
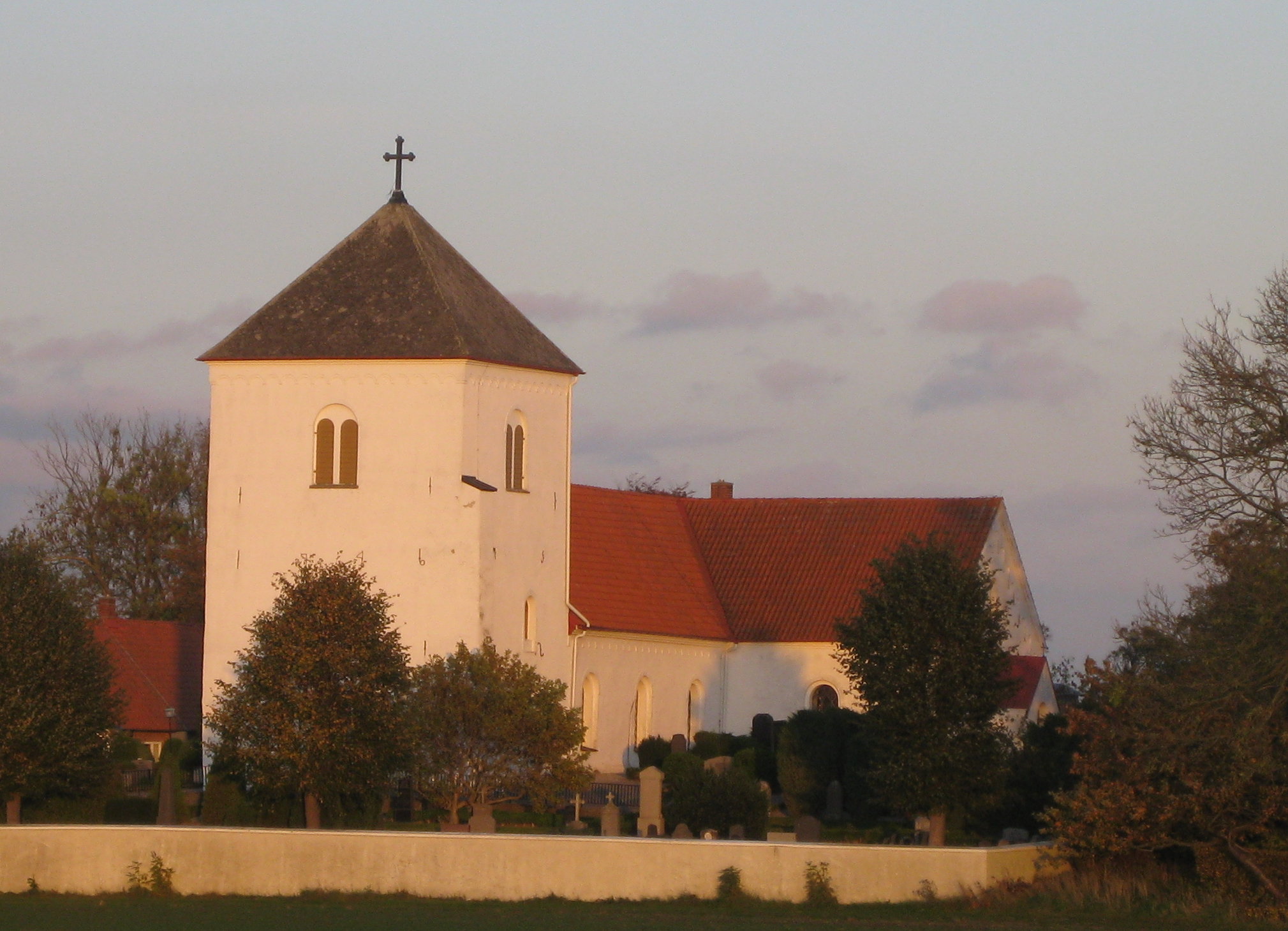
- Grönby Church

- 55°26′35″N 13°21′20″E
- Country: Sweden
- Denomination: Church of Sweden

Administration
- Diocese: Lund

Grönby Church (Swedish: Grönby kyrka) is a medieval church in Grönby, Trelleborg Municipality, in the province of Skåne, Sweden.

== History ==
Grönby Church was built circa 1200. It was enlarged in the 14th century, and the tower was also built later during the Middle Ages. A major enlargement of the church was made in the 1870s to designs by Carl Georg Brunius. Brunius replaced the medieval choir with a larger one and two transepts. The pulpit and altarpiece of the church were made in the 19th century, but the baptismal font is original, dating from the construction period of the church. A medieval terracotta medallion with a portrait of Saint Peter was discovered in the church attic in 1998 and is today again displayed in the church.

== Murals ==
The church also contains medieval murals, dating from the second half of the 14th century. The vaults of the nave are adorned with purely decorative paintings, and the easternmost vault of the nave also displays a depiction of Last Judgment. The church murals were rediscovered in the 1860s after having been covered with whitewash.
