= Enåker Church =

Coordinates: 60°02′06″N 16°47′59″E

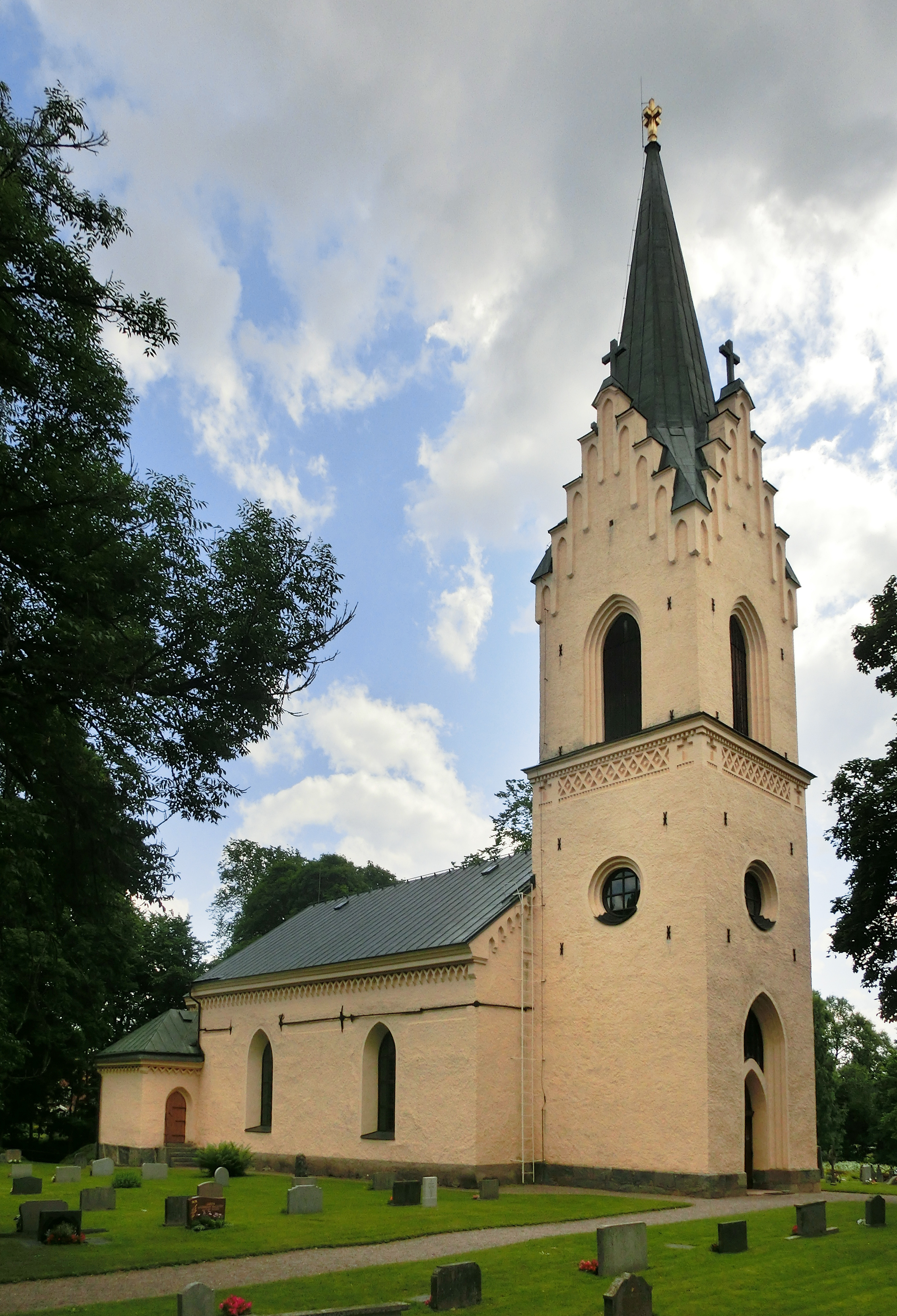
Enåker Church, external view

Enåker Church (Swedish: Enåkers kyrka) is a Lutheran church located a few kilometres north-east of Sala in the Archdiocese of Uppsala in Uppsala County, Sweden.

== History ==
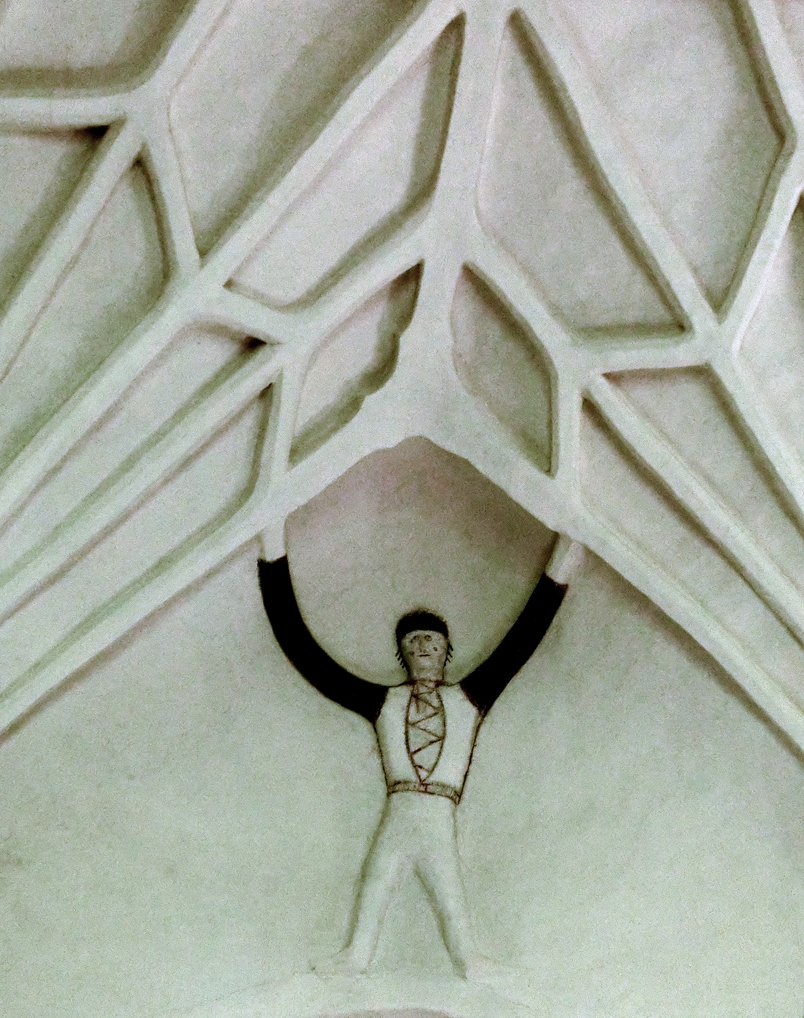
Medieval fresco remains in the form of "vault men"

The church dates from the 14th century. The oldest part of the presently visible structure is the nave. This first church probably had a wooden ceiling, but was vaulted in the 15th century. The vaults were decorated with frescos only a little later, and again in the 16th century.

In the 18th century the church was changed internally, when it received new furnishings (such as pews) and the frescos were covered with plaster. The style which came to dominate the church was a form of airy neoclassicism. The medieval church porch and vestry were also demolished during this century.

By contrast, in the 19th century the church was again rather heavily reconstructed, this time in a Gothic Revival style. The entire exterior was remade in 1854–55. At this time the presently visible tower was also erected.

Further interior redecorations of the church took place in 1890 (destroying most of the remaining medieval frescos) and in 1925, again in a medievalist style. A more delicate renovation was carried out in 1955, when the remaining fresco fragments were also uncovered. During renovation works carried out in 2013, several coins (including some from the Middle Ages) and some graves, including children's graves, were found under the church floor.

== Architecture ==
The exterior of the church is characteristically neo-Gothic. The entrance is through the copper-clad and corbie stepped western tower. Inside, the nave is still dominated by its medieval vaults, some of which are decorated with fragmentary remains of frescos. Some of the frescos, depicting the Veil of Veronica, were made by the so-called Tierp group or master. There are also remaining frescos in the vault, so-called "vault men". The pews are reconstructions of pews from church dating from the 17th century, made during the 1955 renovation. Two decorative pyramids (17th century) adorn the front pews. Some medieval furnishings still survive as well: the baptismal font is from the 13th century (and thus probably older than the church), and there is a wooden statue of Saint Bridget of Sweden from the 15th century. A triumphal cross from the 13th century, altered in the 15th century, also survive in the church, as do the medieval altarpiece, although some of its figures have been lost. It is probably made by a Swedish craftsman and shows influences from northern German art. The pulpit is from 1708, and the church was adorned with new stained glass windows by artist Julia Lüning in 1955.

== Gallery ==
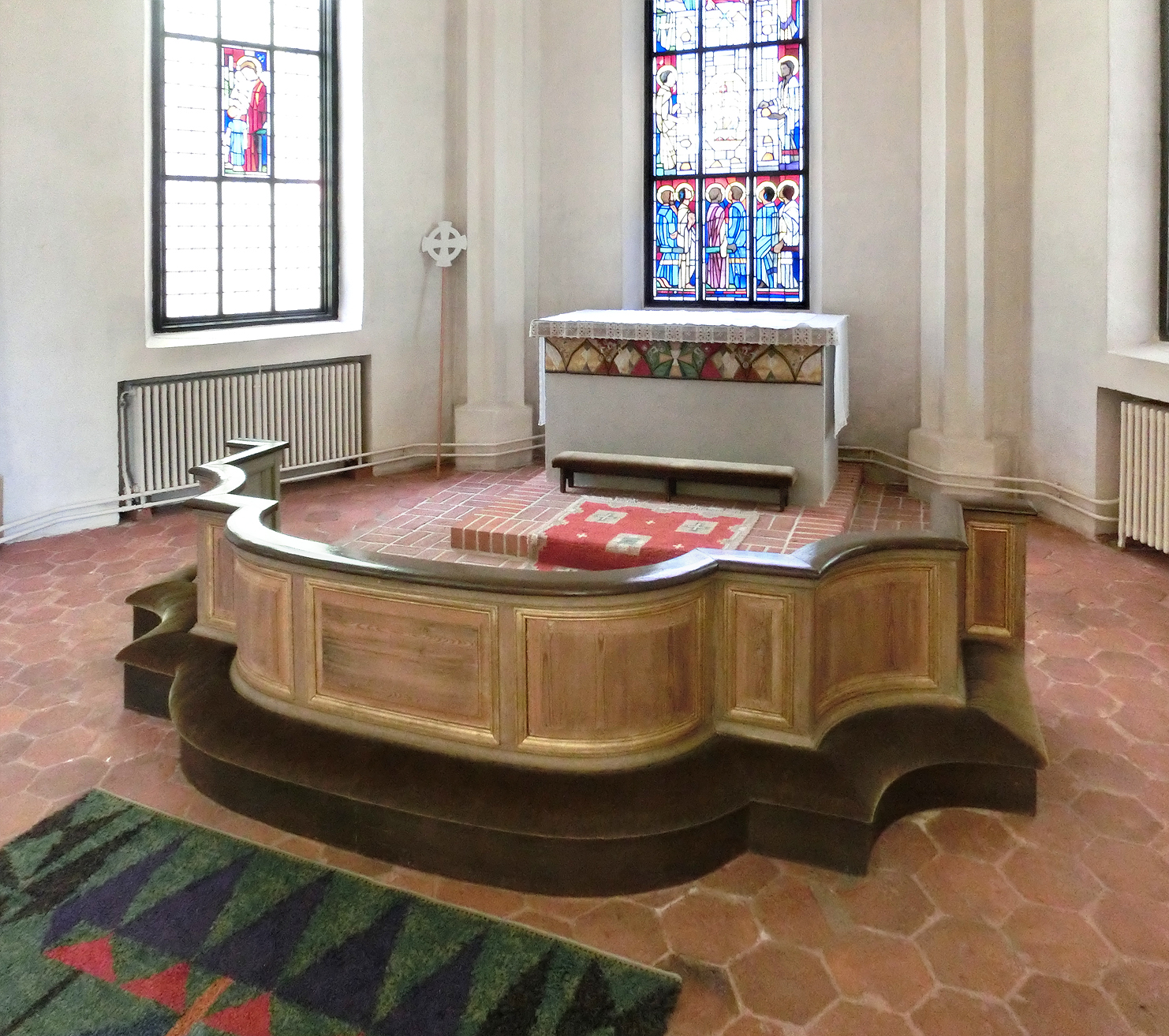
Altar

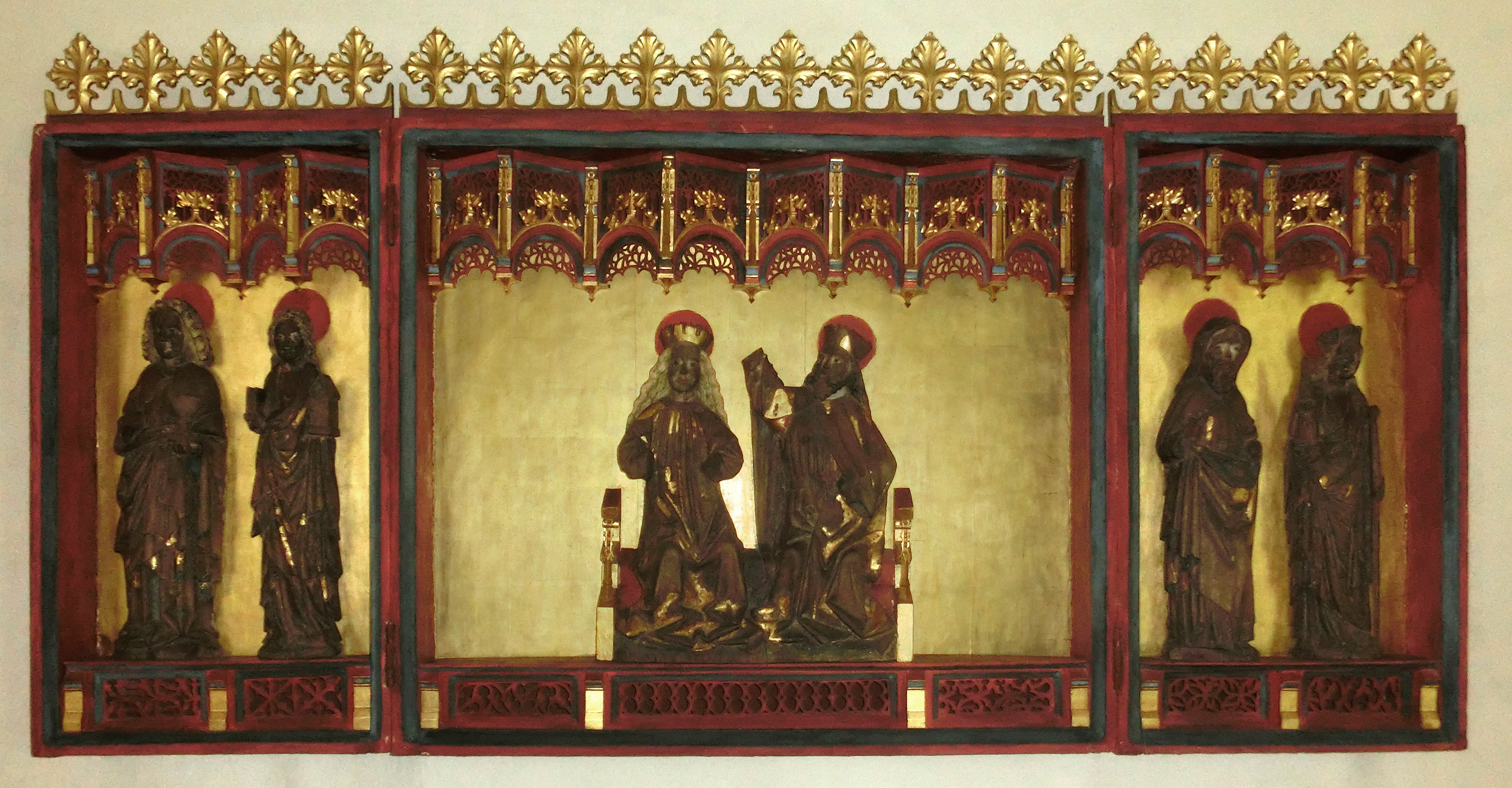
Altarpiece

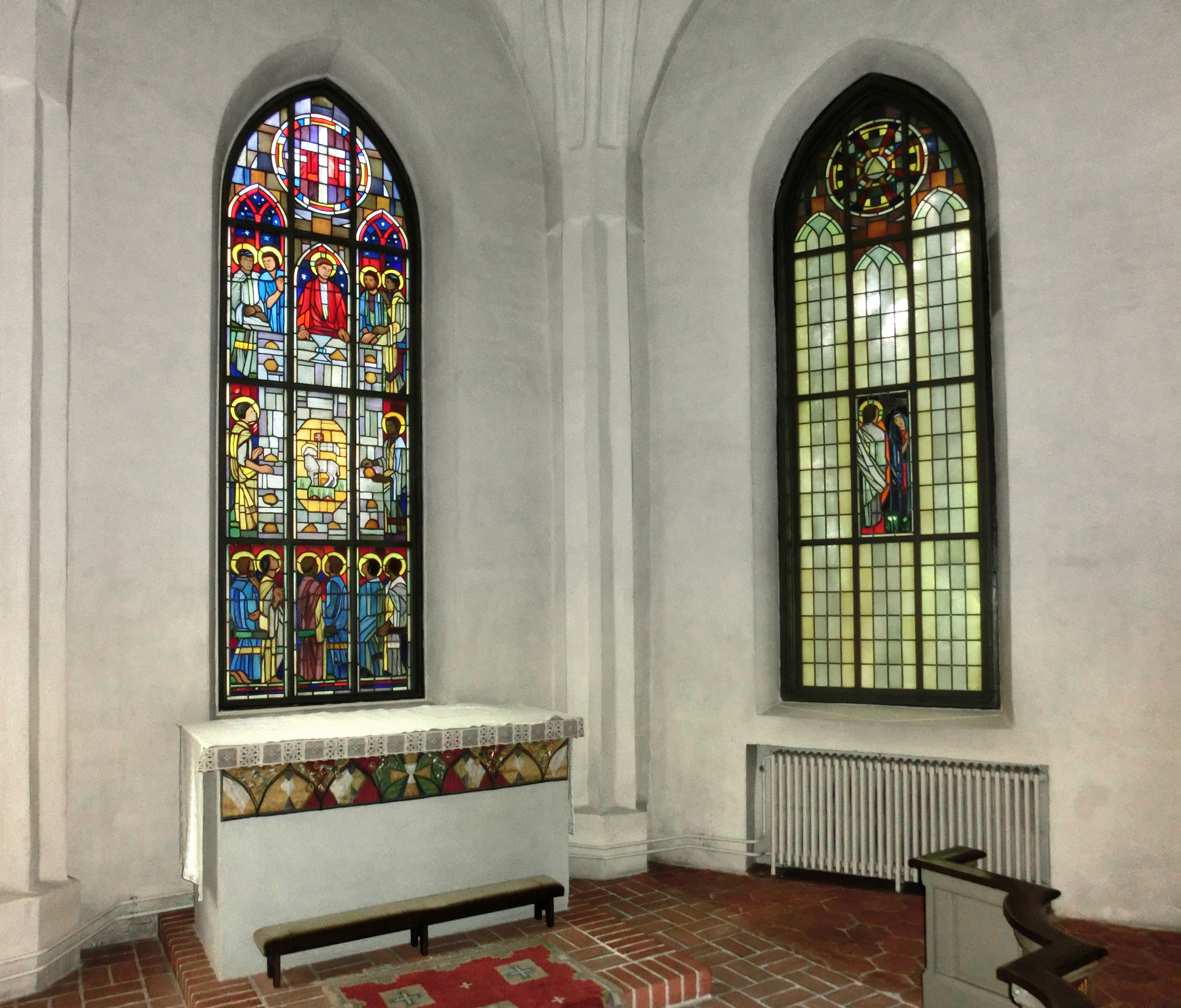
Stained glass windows

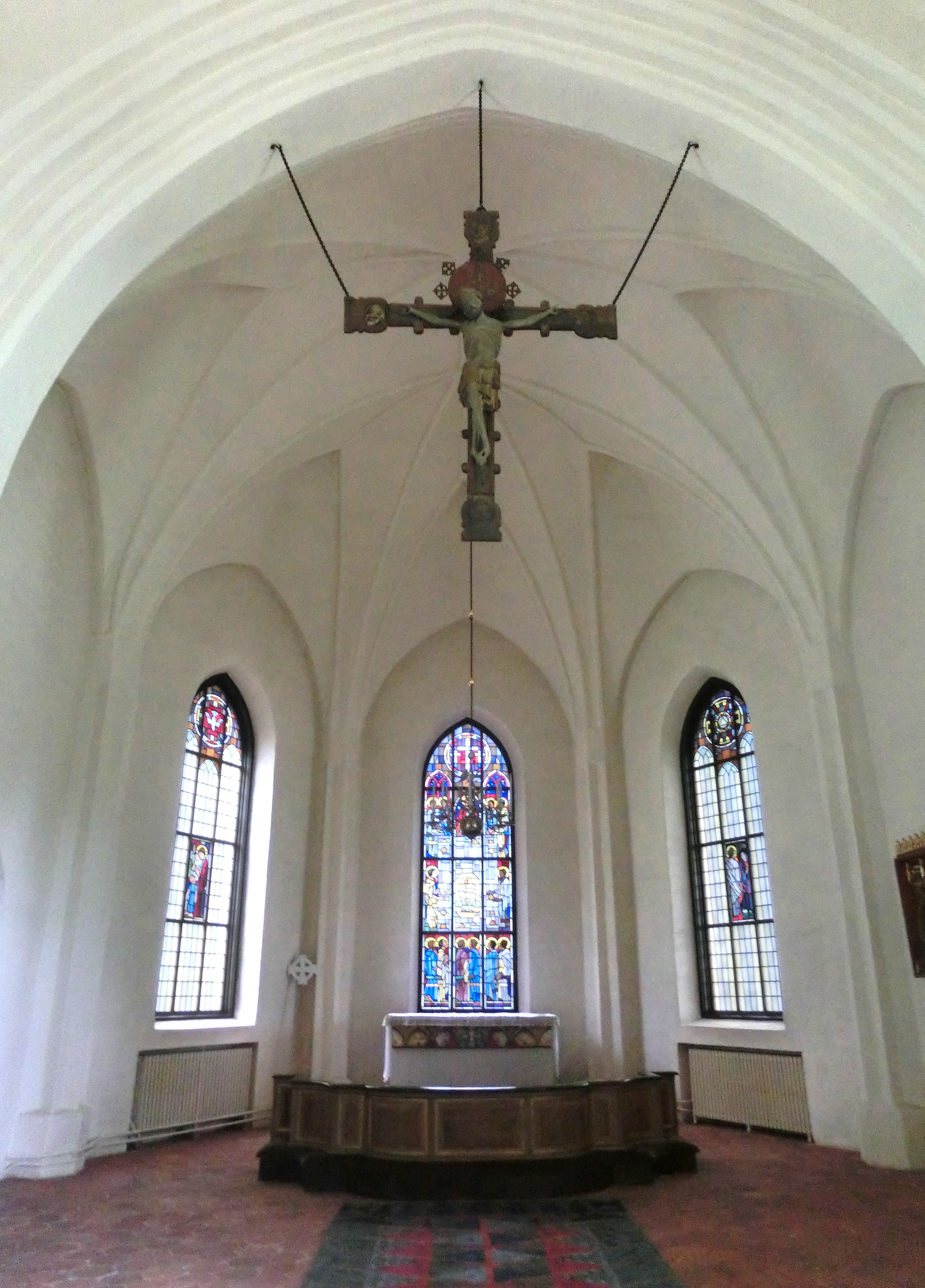
Triumphal cross

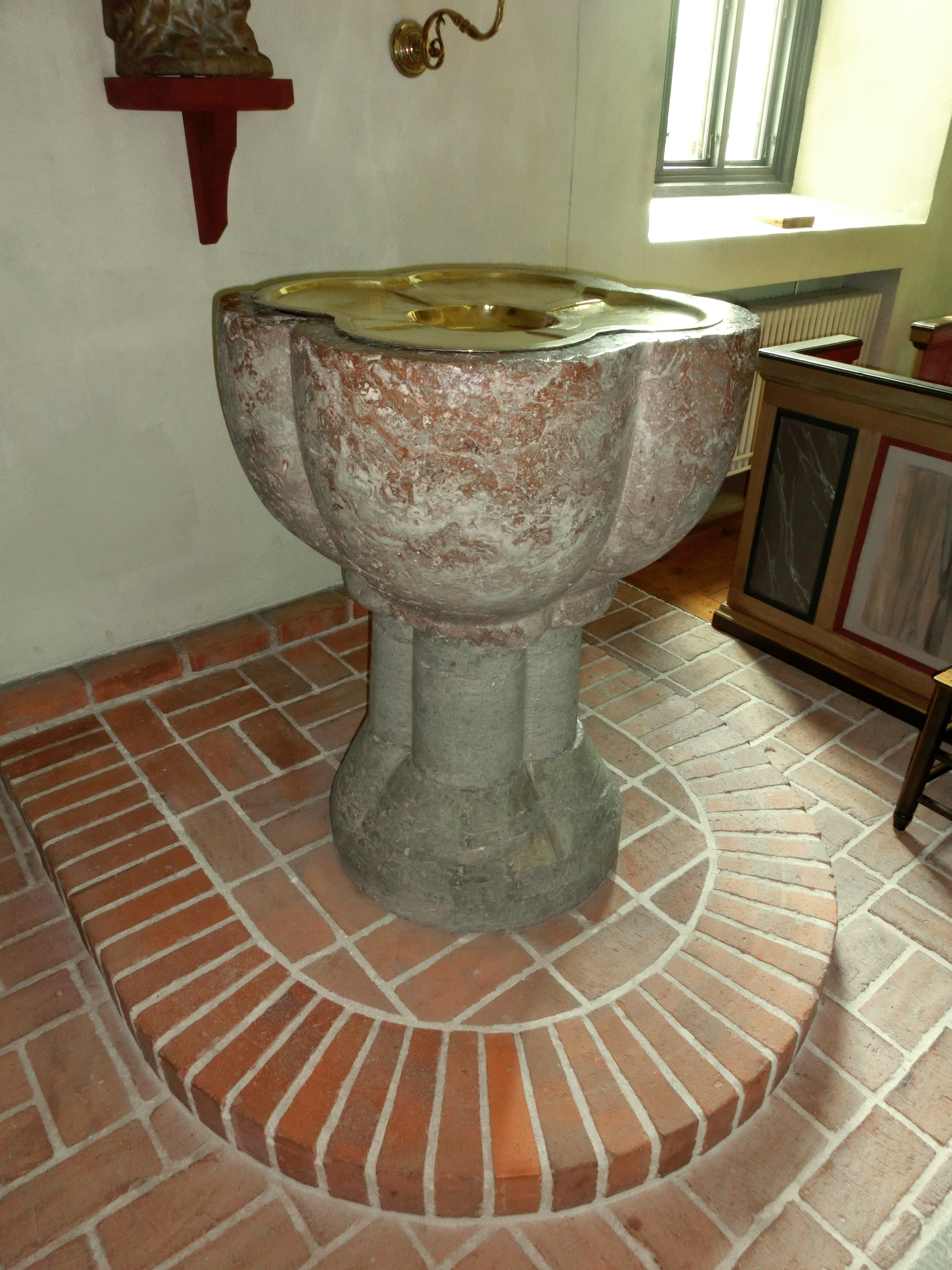
Baptismal font
