= Jumkil Church =

Medieval Lutheran church

Coordinates: 59°56′33″N 17°25′24″E

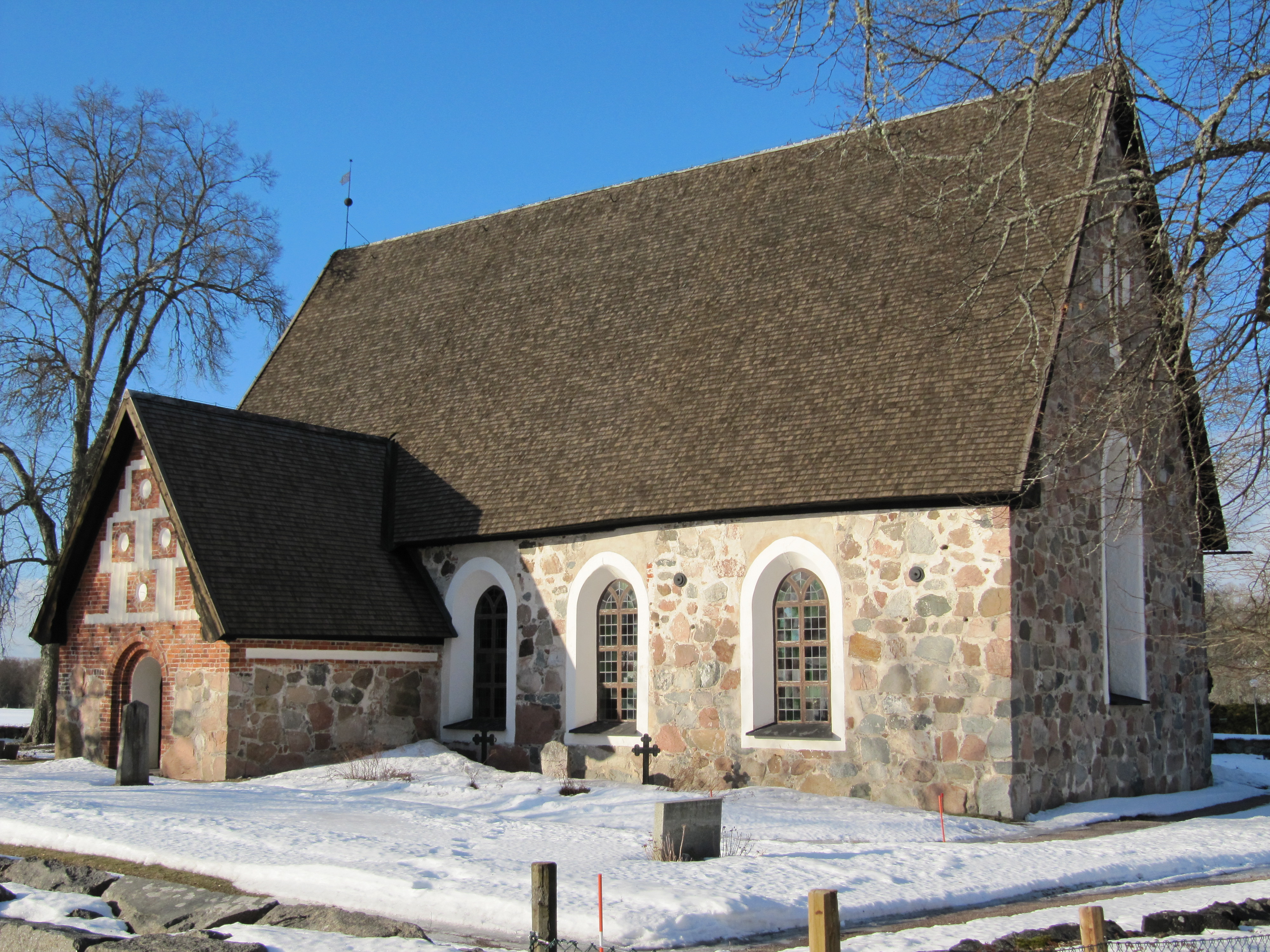
Jumkil Church, external view

Jumkil Church (Swedish: Jumkils kyrka) is a medieval Lutheran church near Uppsala in the Archdiocese of Uppsala in Uppsala County, Sweden.

== History and architecture ==
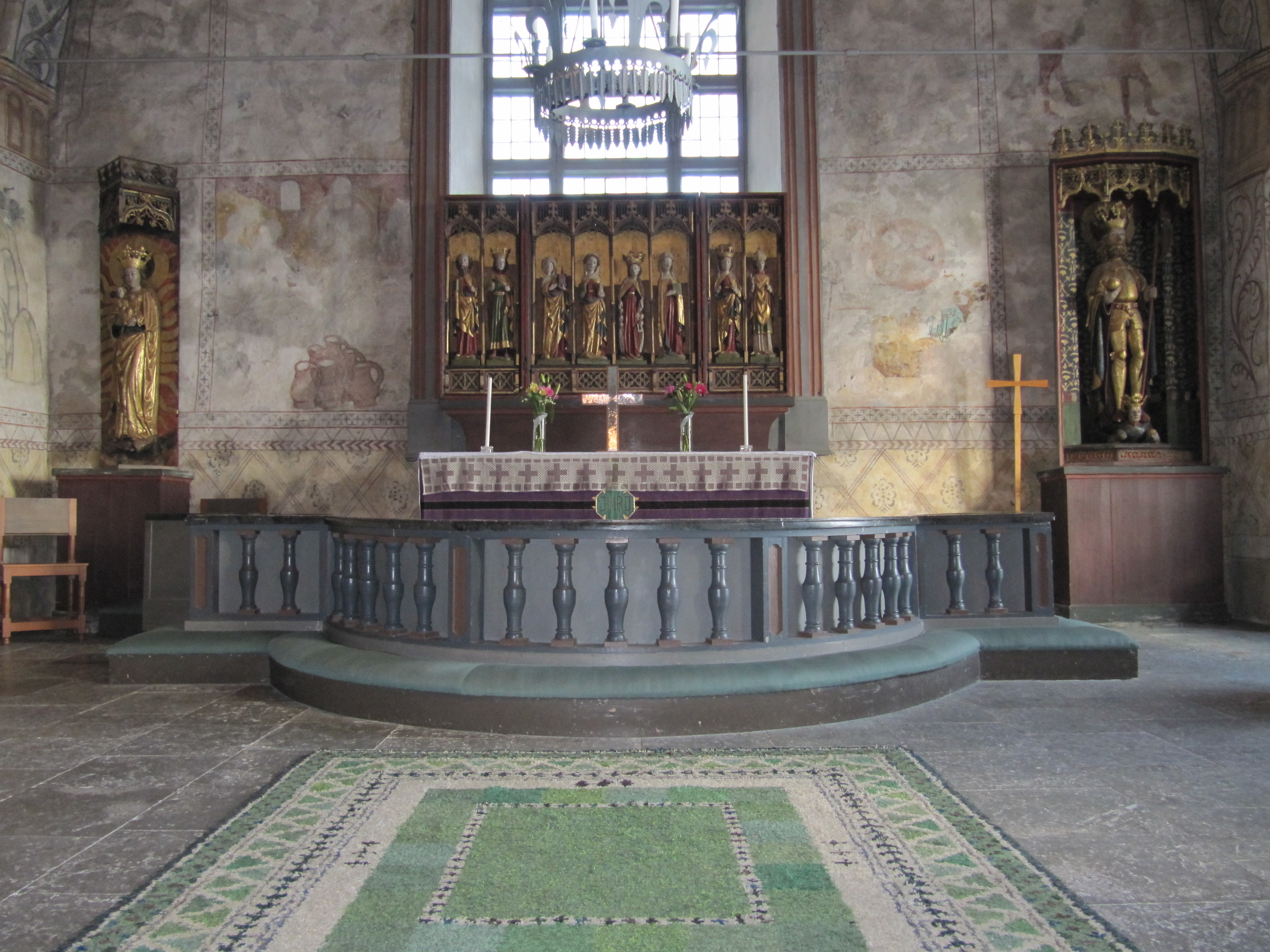
Interior view of the choir with the altarpiece (1470s), flanked by medieval sculptures depicting Mary and Saint Olaf

Jumkil church was built at the beginning of the 14th century, and still retains much of the appearance it received then. Externally, only the Brick Gothic church porch is of later date, being added in the 16th century. Internally, the church received brick vaults in the 15th century, of which those in the choir are decorated with frescos by an unknown medieval master, depicting (among other motifs) the Coat of arms of Sweden and that of Jakob Ulvsson and Sten Sture the Elder.

Several medieval furnishings have been preserved in the church. The oldest is the baptismal font, dating from the late 12th century and thus pre-dating the church itself. It was probably made on Gotland by the master stonemason sometimes referred to as Master Semi-Byzantios. The altarpiece of the church dates from the 1470s. In addition, there are several wooden sculptures of saints housed in the church, including depictions of Mary and Saint Olaf. The triumphal cross dates from circa 1500. The church has a rich collection of church silver, the oldest object dating from the 14th century and including a wine chalice donated to the church by the congregation in gratitude for the peace with Russia in 1721.

The church has an external, wooden bell tower dating from the 18th century.
