= Litslena Church =

Coordinates: 59°39′48″N 17°16′02″E

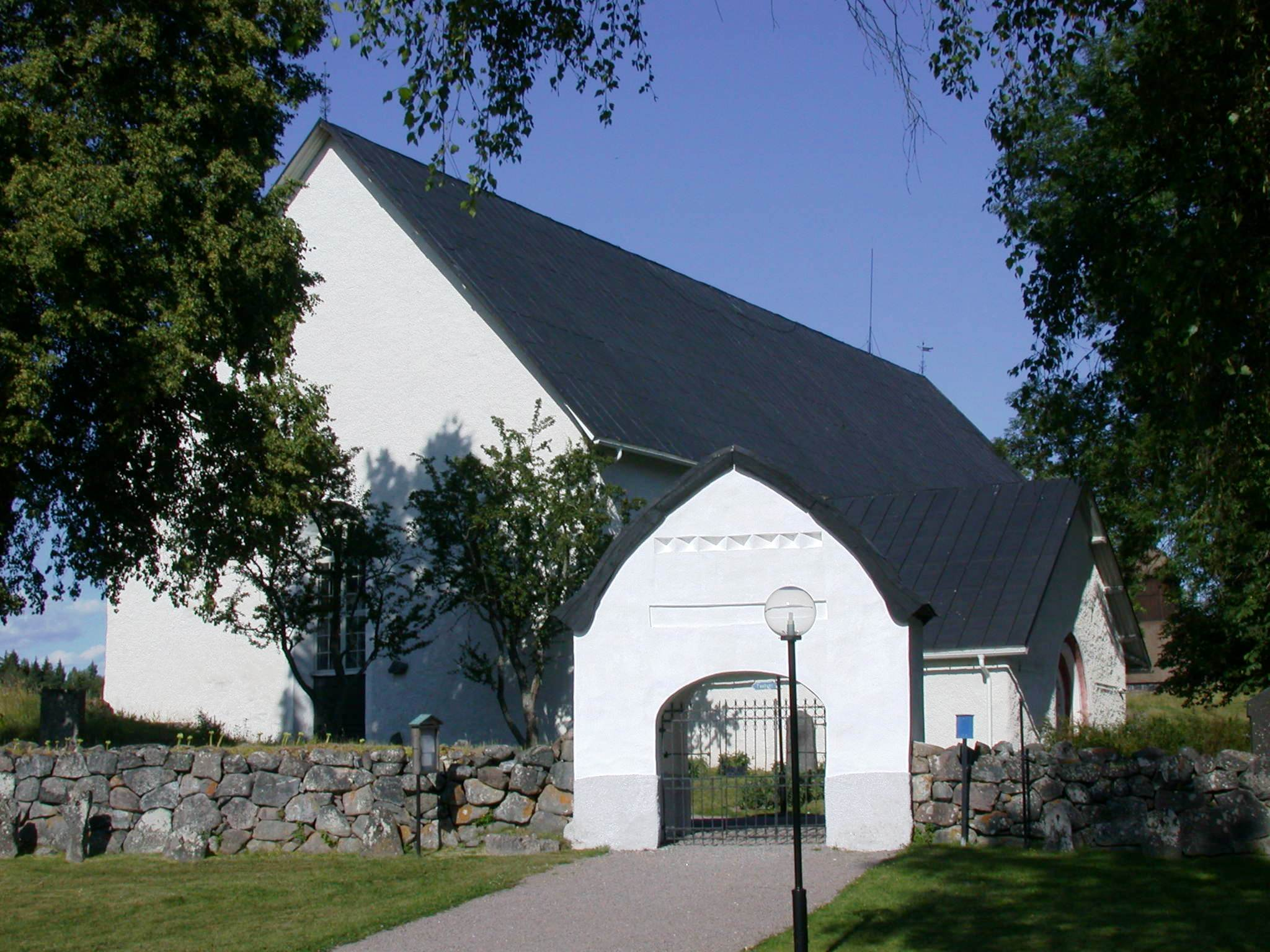
Litslena Church, view of the exterior

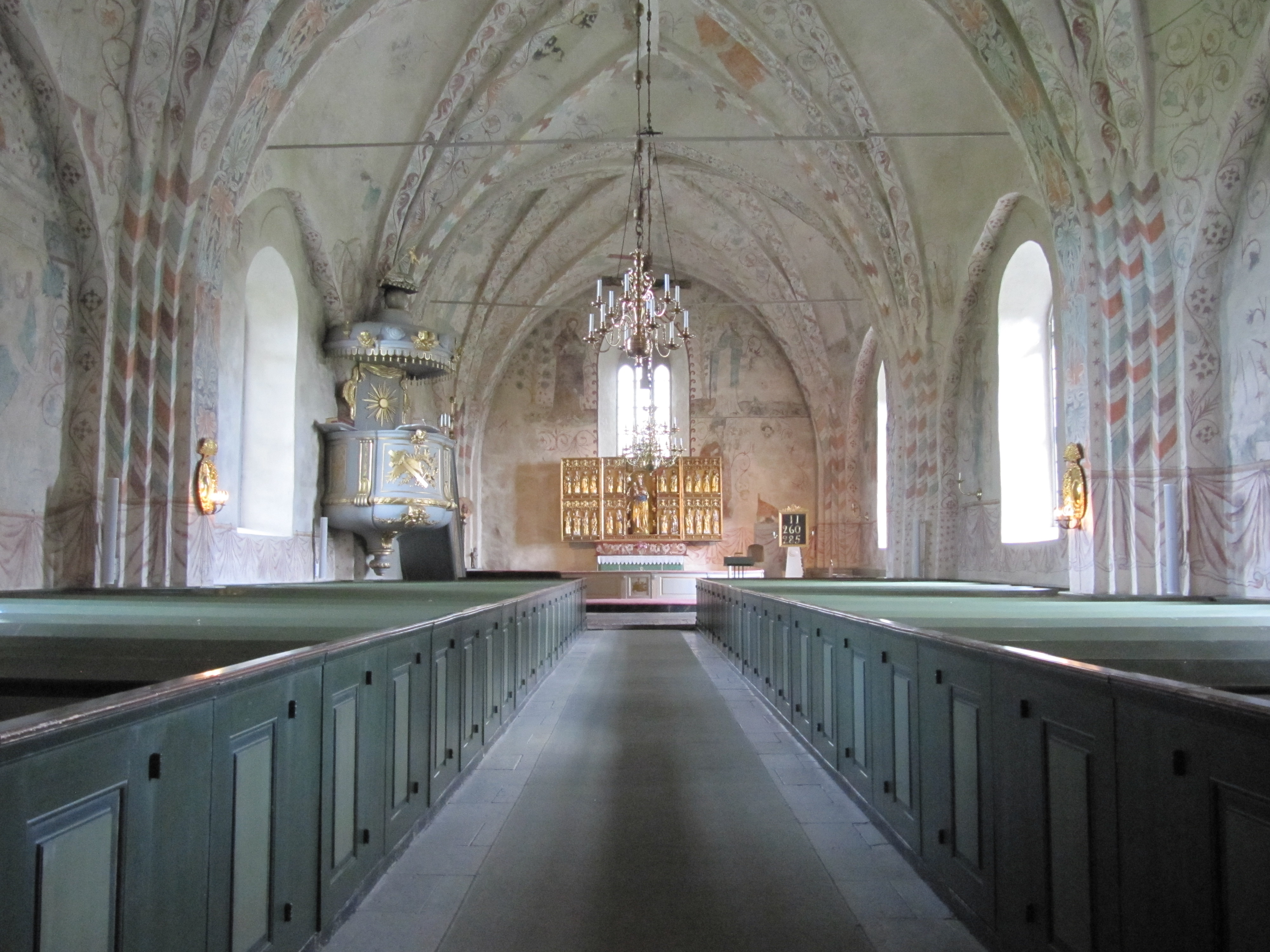
Litslena Church, view of the interior

Litslena Church (Swedish: Litslena kyrka) is a medieval church in the Archdiocese of Uppsala (Church of Sweden) in Uppsala County, Sweden.

== History ==
The fieldstone church was originally dedicated to John the Baptist and was founded in the 12th century. It has been rebuilt in stages during the Middle Ages; it was enlarged in the 14th century and acquired its present vaults during the 15th century. It has not been substantially altered after the Reformation.

== Architecture ==
The church is decorated inside with frescos dating from c. 1470. The frescos differ from other medieval frescos in Sweden in that they have unusually well-preserved colours and in that they were made by an unknown artist not known to have worked on any other church within present-day Sweden. Apart from the frescos, the church also houses a number of historical furnishings. The altarpiece, dedicated to Mary, was made in Lübeck around 1480. Litslena Church also houses other medieval wooden pieces of art, namely a circular dish with a depiction of the head of Christ from the middle of the 15th century and a triumphal cross from approximately the same time. The oldest item in the church is the baptismal font, dating from the 12th century and made of local sandstone. In addition, the church has in its possession a 15th-century chasuble, made of green velvet, probably from Italy decorated with embroidery of probably Polish origin. The church also possesses a late medieval paten bearing an image of Saint Anne together with Mary and Christ.
