= Tensta Church =

Coordinates: 60°02′26″N 17°40′18″E

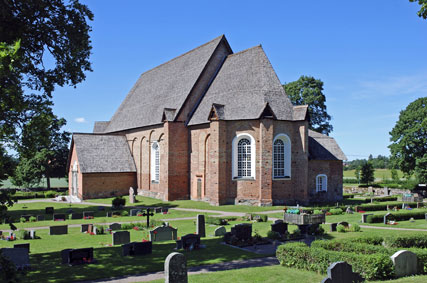
Tensta Church, external view

Tensta Church (Swedish: Tensta kyrka) is a medieval Lutheran church in the Archdiocese of Uppsala in Uppsala County, Sweden. It is a representative example of the Brick Gothic style in Sweden.

== History and architecture ==
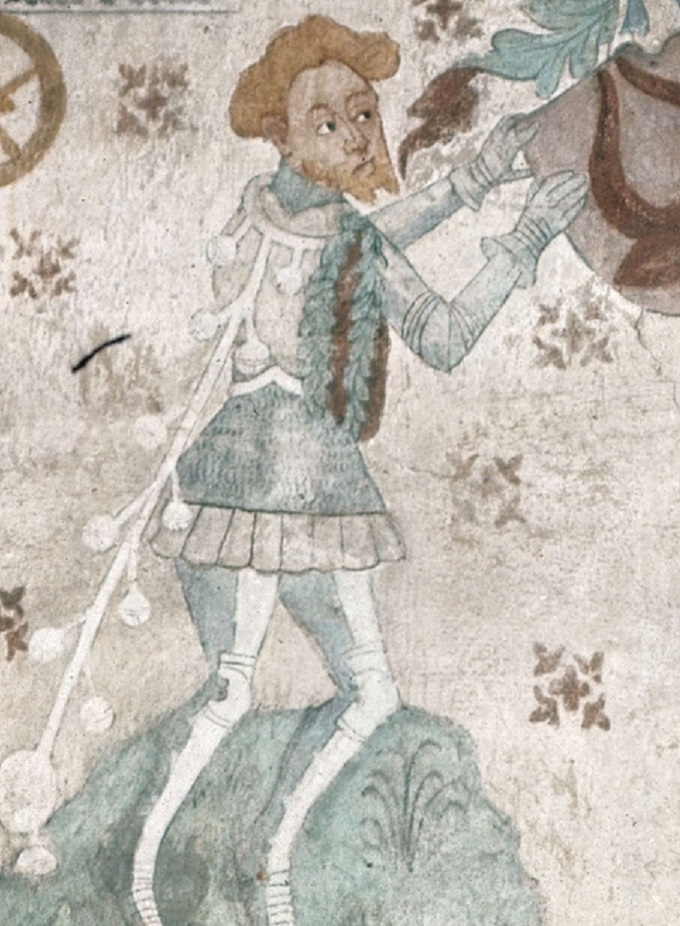
Portrait of Bengt Jönsson Oxenstierna by Johannes Rosenrod, the first deliberate portrait in Swedish art

Tensta Church was probably commissioned by a local aristocratic family, perhaps the owners of Salsta manor house, and built during the last years of the 13th century. The only part of the church which is of later date is the church porch, which was added during the 14th century. Internally, an original wooden ceiling was also replaced by a vaulted brick ceiling in the 1430s.

Just outside the church is a preserved runestone (Uppland Runic Inscription 1034). The exterior of the church is rather sophisticated in comparison with most comparable churches in Uppland, thanks to the more dynamic material used, i.e. brick rather than granite. It is decorated with blind arches and supported by buttresses. The western end of the church seems to have been built as a separate chapel from the start, perhaps as a family chapel for the commissioning family, or as a chapel to house the baptismal font. The interior of the church is richly decorated with frescos, the oldest of which are signed by the master Johannes Rosenrod in 1437. These frescos depict the life of Jesus and Mary, as well as the life of Saint Bridget. In addition, the frescos include a full-figure portrait of Bengt Jönsson Oxenstierna, kneeling in a suit of armour next to his coat of arms. The portrait is said to be the first deliberate portrait in Swedish history of art. Bengt Jönsson Oxenstierna was the owner of Salsta manor at the time and for this reason it has been suggested that this is a portrait of the church donor. There are also a few later frescos, painted circa 1480 and during the 16th centuries, respectively.

The church has two medieval baptismal fonts. The altarpiece is a work from the 1480s, made in Stockholm. Unfortunately, only the central part remains. There is also an iron chandelier in the choir, dating from the 15th century.

== See also ==
- List of Brick Gothic buildings
- List of church frescos in Sweden
