= Death playing chess =

Painting

- Döden spelar schack (Swedish)
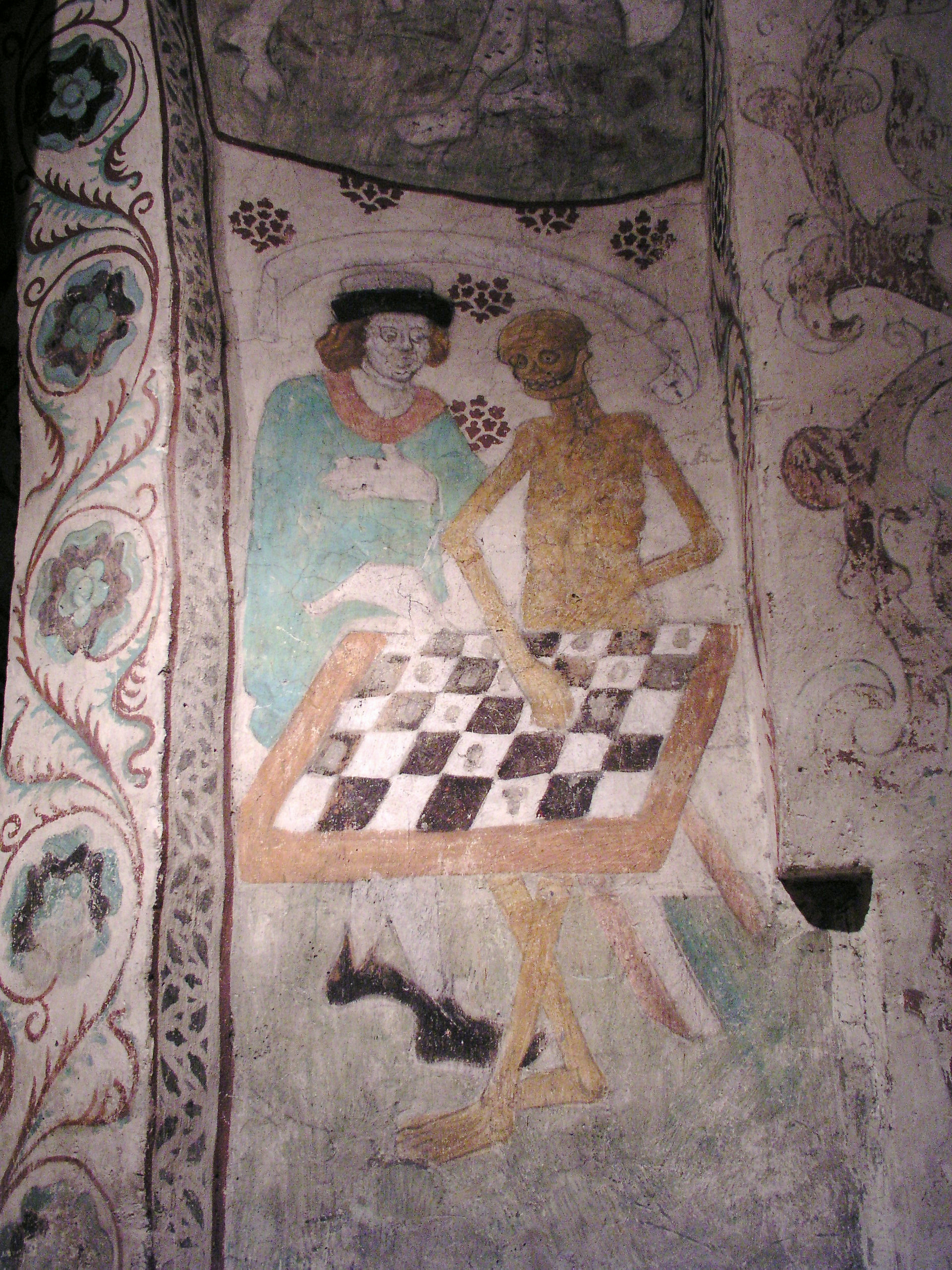
- Artist: Albertus Pictor
- Year: 1480
- Medium: mural
- Location: Täby Church, Täby Municipality, Stockholm County, Sweden (original)

Death playing chess (in Swedish: Döden spelar schack) is a monumental painting in Täby Church located just outside Stockholm, Sweden. It was painted around 1480–1490, by the Swedish medieval painter Albertus Pictor.

The painting depicts a man and a skeleton at a chessboard. Above them is a ribbon, now faded, which once read "Jak spelar tik matt", "I play checkmate".

A copy of the mural is stored in the collections of the Swedish Museum of History in Stockholm.

== Analysis ==
The artist was born with the name Albrecht, and was sometimes called Immenhusen, after the village Immenhusen in Hesse, Germany. It is assumed that Albertus was educated in southern Germany.

He is one of the most significant medieval Swedish artists. His works represent a unique combination of quality and quantity. He painted 36 churches in Mälardalen and Norrbotten. He stands out as the most active artist in Swedish church painting in the second half of the 15th century. He differs from other artists of the same period with his bright expression. His painting has unusual breadth and diversity in his technical performance. This mural represents how a knight plays chess with death and skillfully depicts figures with precise anatomical proportions, combining them with clothes and weapons, with a relatively realistic vision.

The mural inspired Ingmar Bergman to create the film The Seventh Seal in 1957.
