= Ingegerdsleden =

Hiking trail in Sweden

Coordinates: 59°34′27″N 17°50′41″E

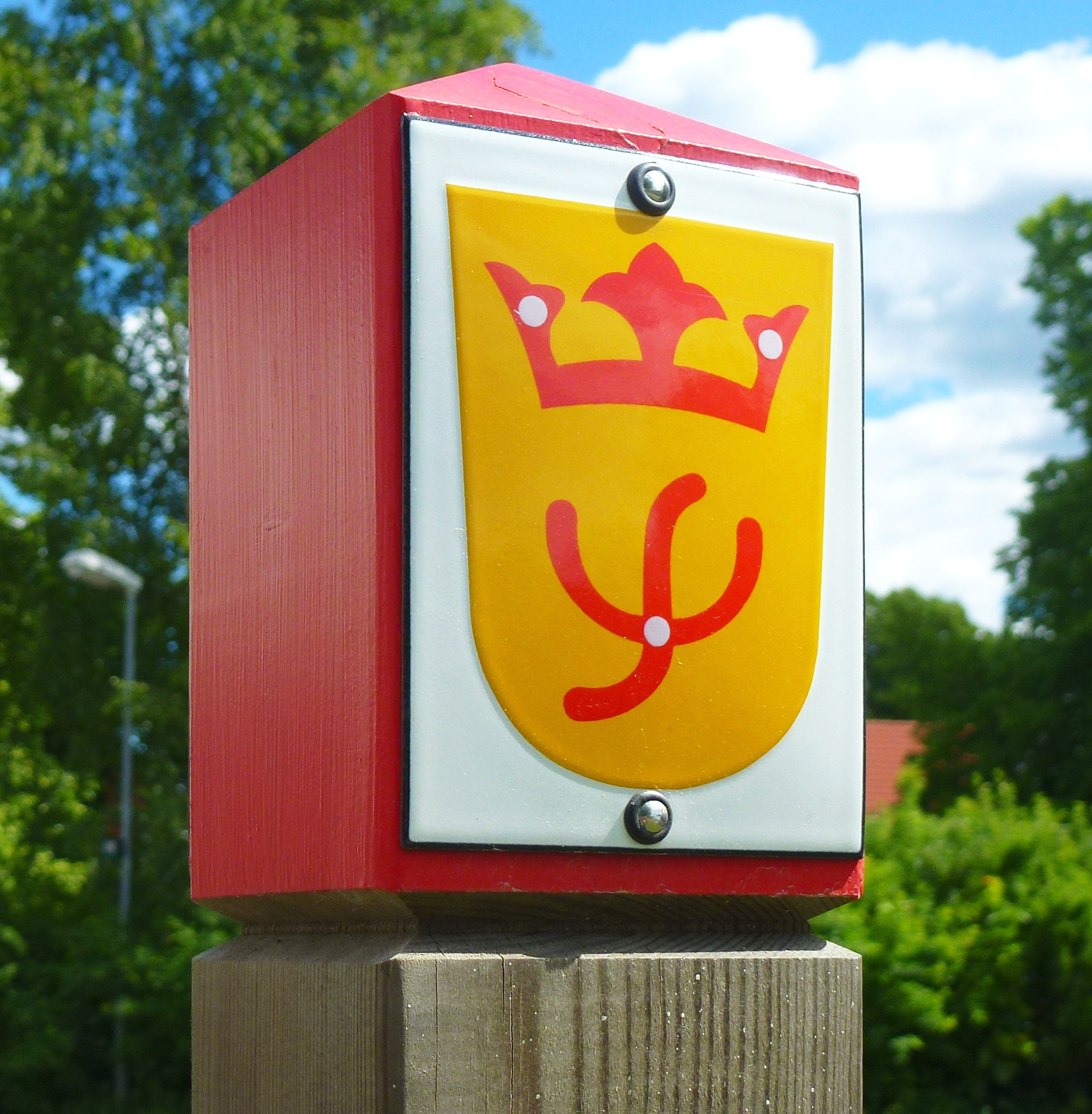
The symbol of Ingegerdsleden.

Ingegerdsleden ("the Ingegerd trail") is a pilgrimage route in the province of Uppland in Sweden, between Stockholm Cathedral (Storkyrkan) and Uppsala Cathedral (Uppsala domkyrka). The hiking trail is approximately 110 kilometres (68 mi) and passes historical places, churches, palaces and nature reserves.

The trail is named after the Swedish princess Ingegerd Olofsdotter, daughter of Swedish king Olof Skötkonung and who after she married became Grand princess of Kiev. After her death Ingegerd was later declared a saint by the name of St. Anna in Novgorod.

== Route ==
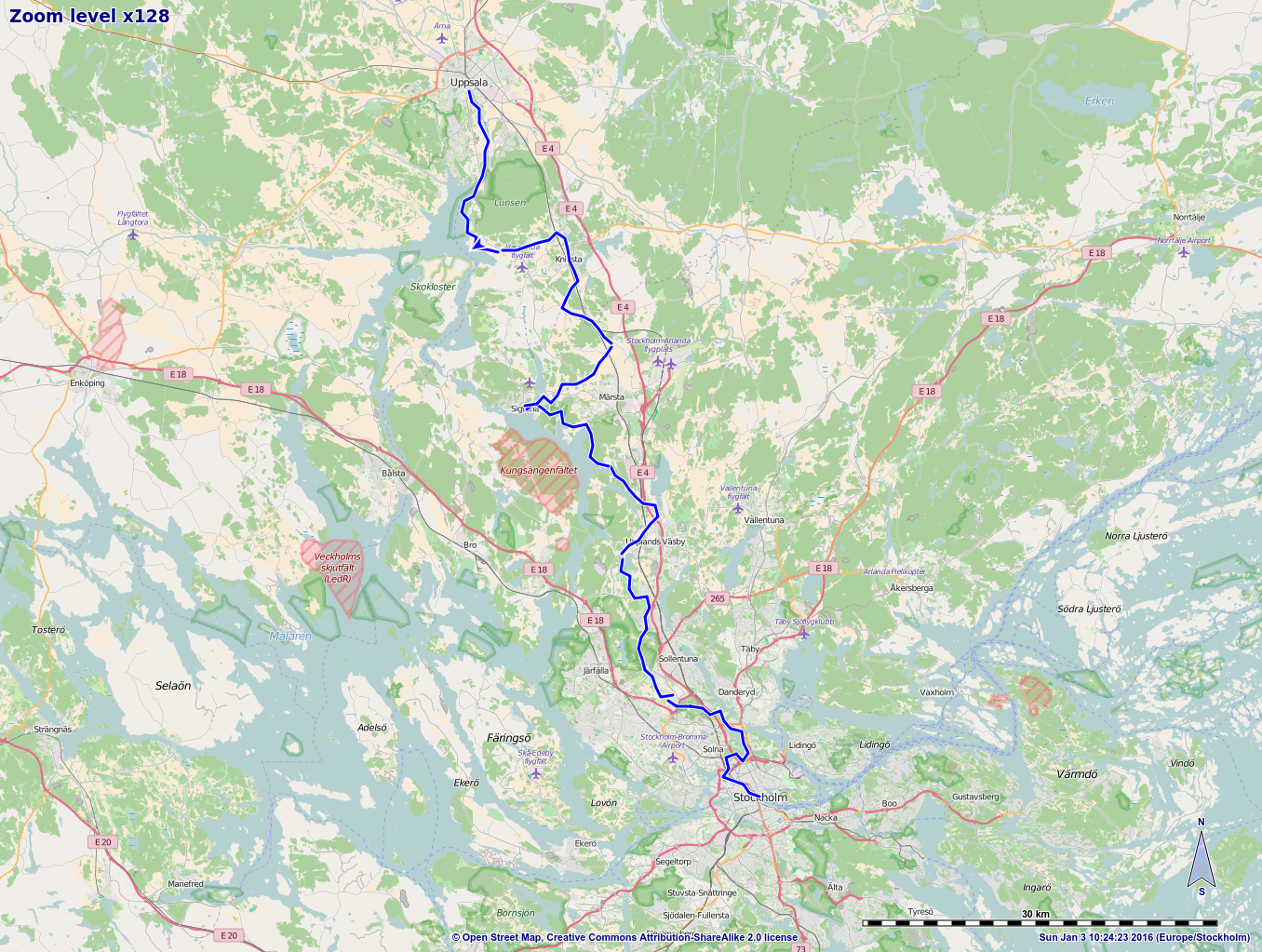
The Ingegerd trail, a pilgrimage route in the province of Uppland, Sweden.

The Ingegerd trail is divided into seven separate walks:

- Stockholm Cathedral – Ulriksdal - Kista Church 22 km
- Kista Church - Ed Church 16 km
- Ed Church - Rosersberg Palace 14 km
- Rosersberg Palace - Sigtuna 13 km
- Sigtuna - Odensala Church 14 km
- Odensala Church - Alsike Church 14 km
- Alsike Church - Sunnersta Church - Uppsala Cathedral 18 km

In addition to these, there are alternative stretches for easy access to, for example, public transport.

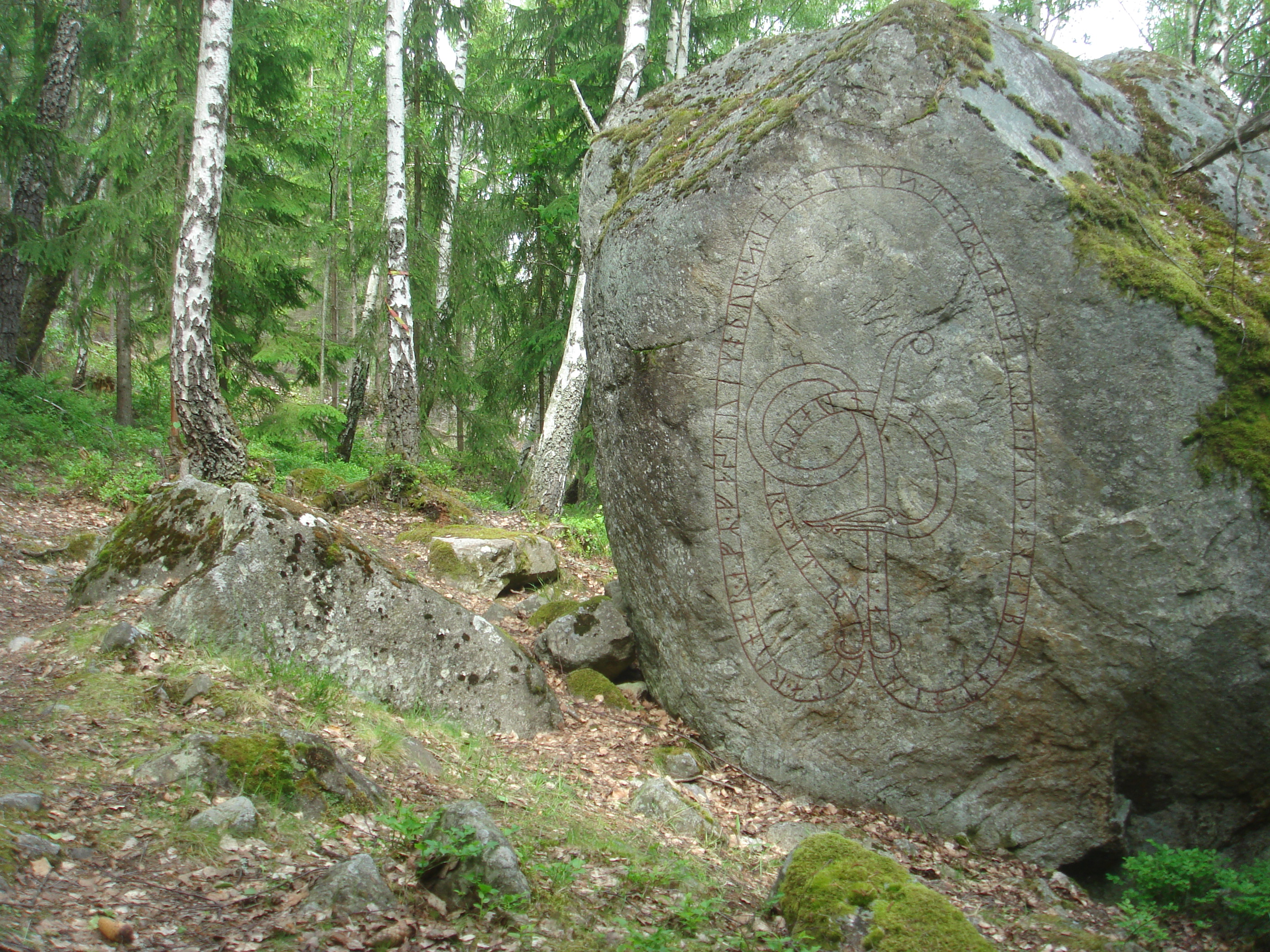
Runestone U 112 beside the Ed Church path

== See also ==
- Ingegerd Olofsdotter of Sweden
- Church of Sweden
