= Danmark Church =

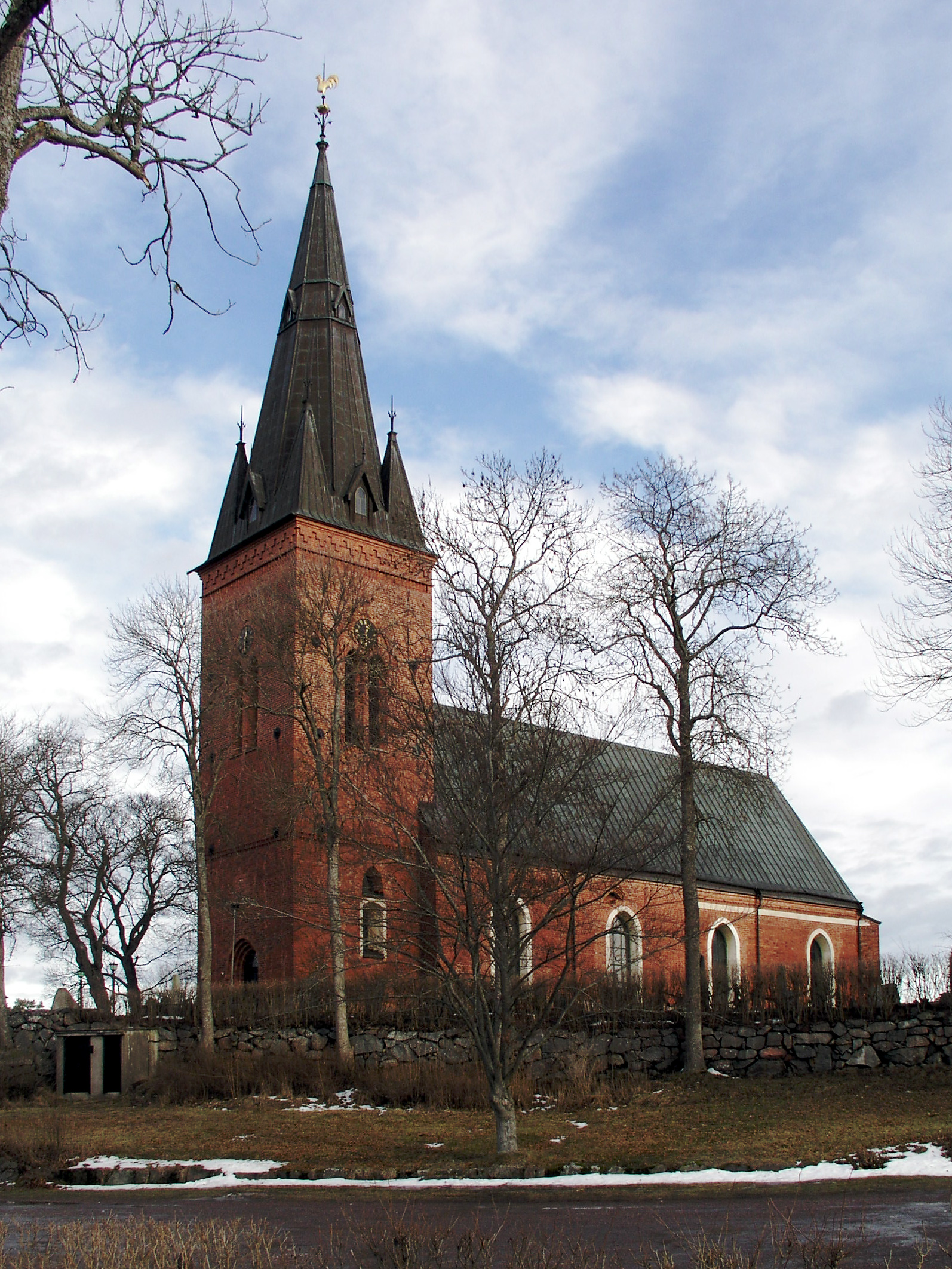
- Danmark Church
- Danmark Church
- 59°49′58.6″N 17°44′42″E
- Location: Uppsala
- Country: Sweden
- Denomination: Lutheran

Architecture
- Functional status: Active

Administration
- Archdiocese: Uppsala
- Parish: Danmark-Funbo

Danmark Church (Swedish: Danmarks kyrka) is a church located in the minor locality of Danmark in Uppsala Municipality, Sweden, some 8 kilometers southeast of Uppsala.

== History ==
The church is first attested in writing in 1291. In proximity to the church are several runestones, featuring Christian inscriptions and crosses. The church itself is a brick building, the oldest parts of which stem from the 14th century. By the late 15th century, the church had roughly the same appearance as today, but has since been modified and expanded, notably after being ravaged by fires caused by lightning strikes in 1699 and 1889. After the 1889 fire, the Neo-Gothic spire was added.

The church is situated near Linnaeus Hammarby and was, in 1758–1778, the parish church of Carl Linnaeus; however, Linnaeus received complaints for his tendency to leave before the service had ended. He would also on occasion send his dog, Pompe, in his place, who would also leave early.

== Etymology ==
The origin of the name Danmark is unclear, but several theories have been proposed. The explanation most commonly accepted by modern name research is that the name consists of the prefix dan-, derived from Old Norse dank, meaning "wet" or "boggy", and the suffix -mark meaning "forest" or "forest's edge". Danmark would thus mean "the forest by the wetlands".

Olaus Magnus offers another explanation in A Description of the Northern Peoples (7:15), stating that the church "took its name from the homeland of the enemy [Denmark], as the mighty building was funded by loot taken from him, and thus stands as an eternal memorial for those who have fallen." A third theory postulates that the name translates as "wood of the Danes", suggesting it may have been a settlement for Danes. However, later research asserts that any connection to Denmark is unlikely.

== The building ==
The church features frescos by Johannes Rosenrod and Albertus Pictor. The weathercock is from the late 19th century and was named "weathercock of the year" in 1989. The choir windows were made in 1958 by Julia Lüning.

== Gallery ==
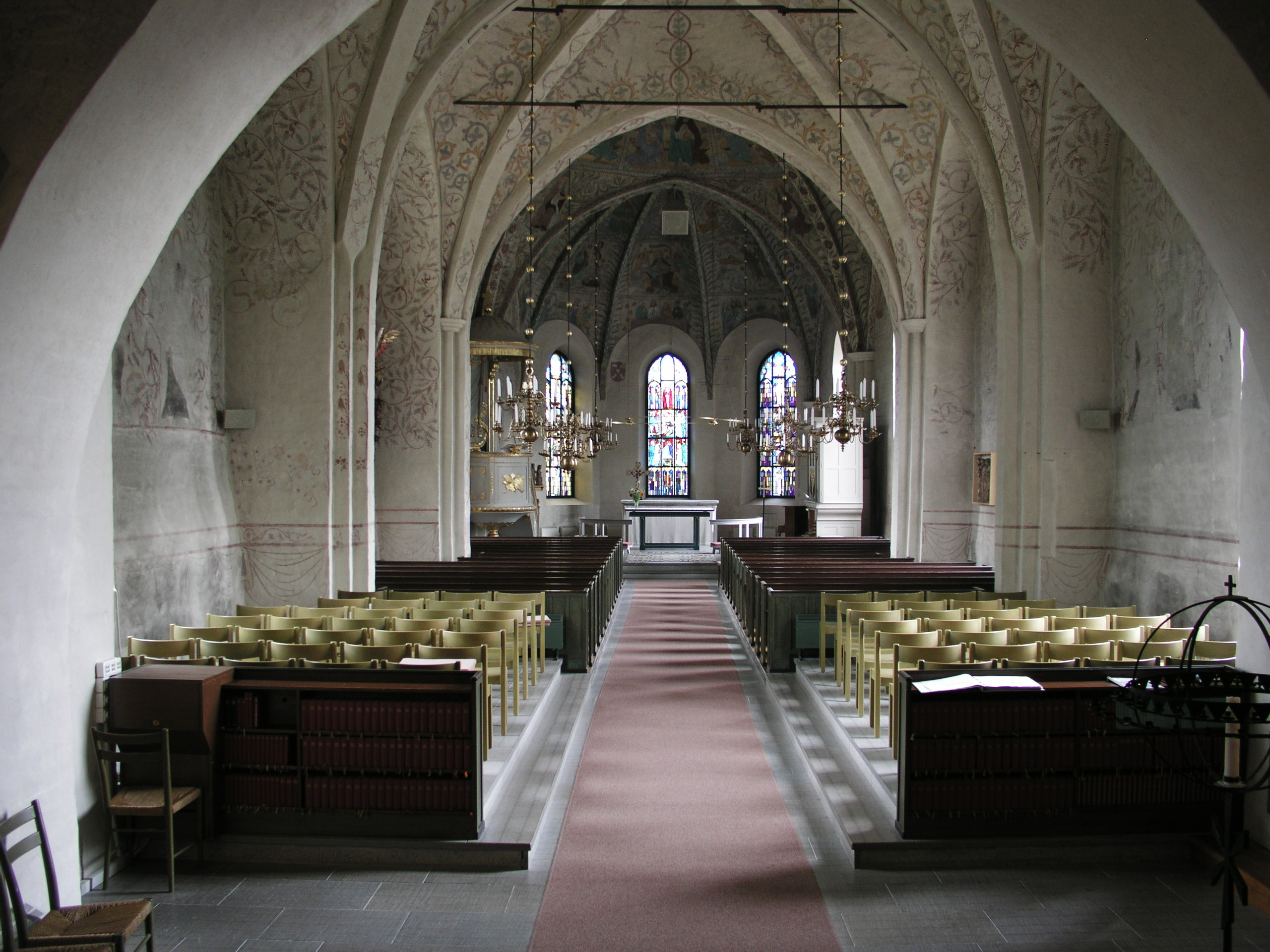
Interior

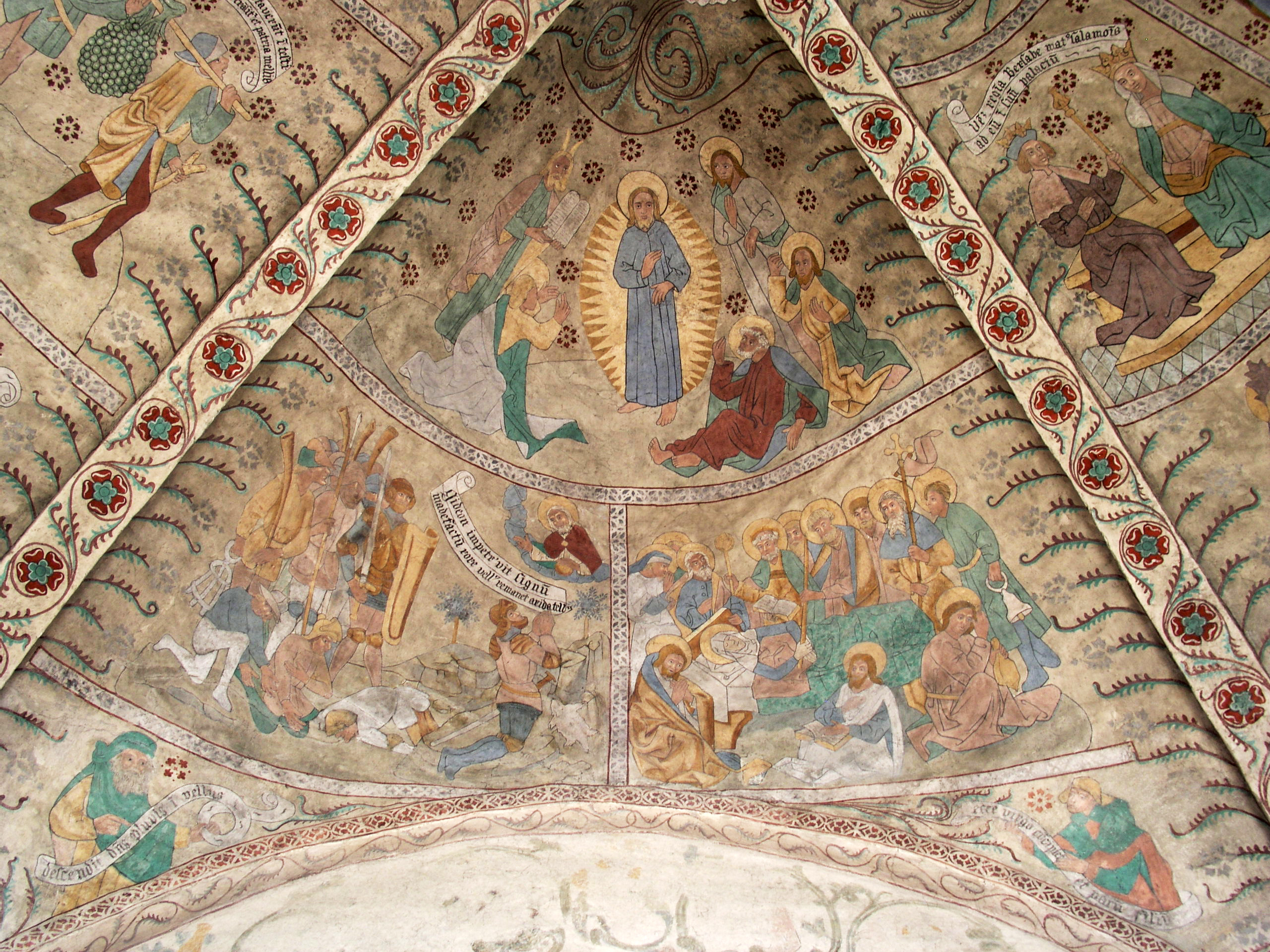
Paintings by Albertus Pictor

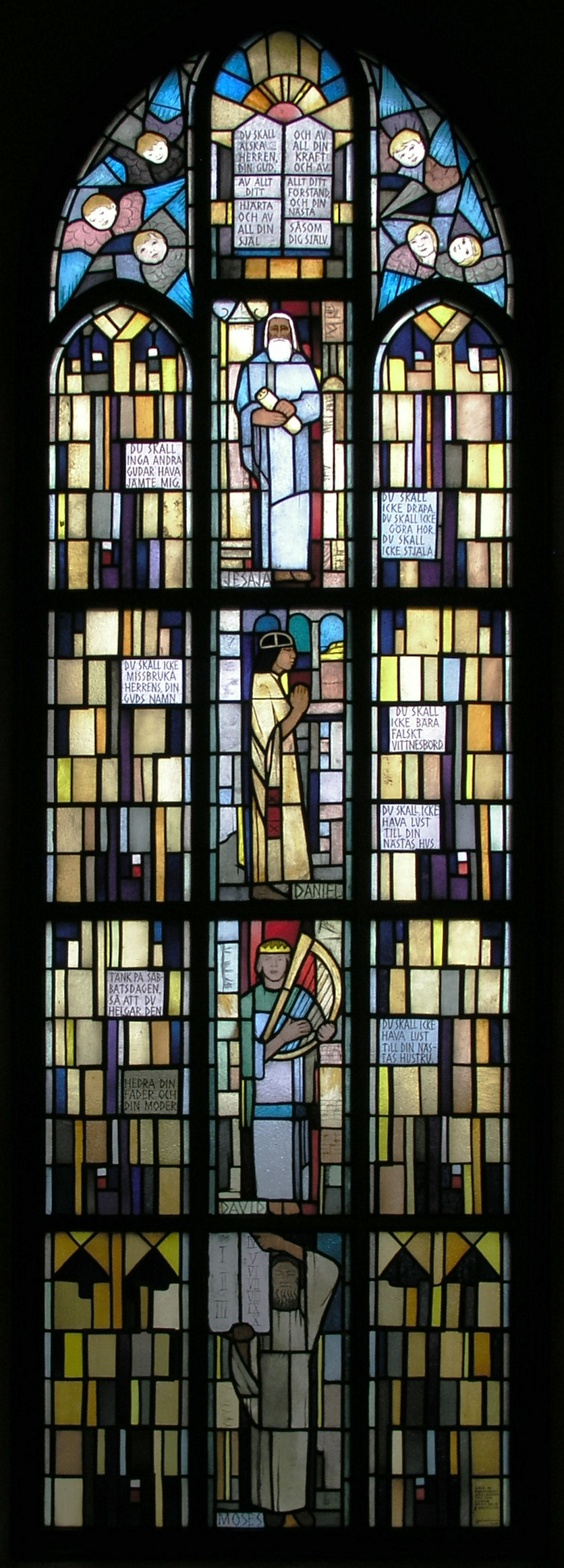
Church window by the altar

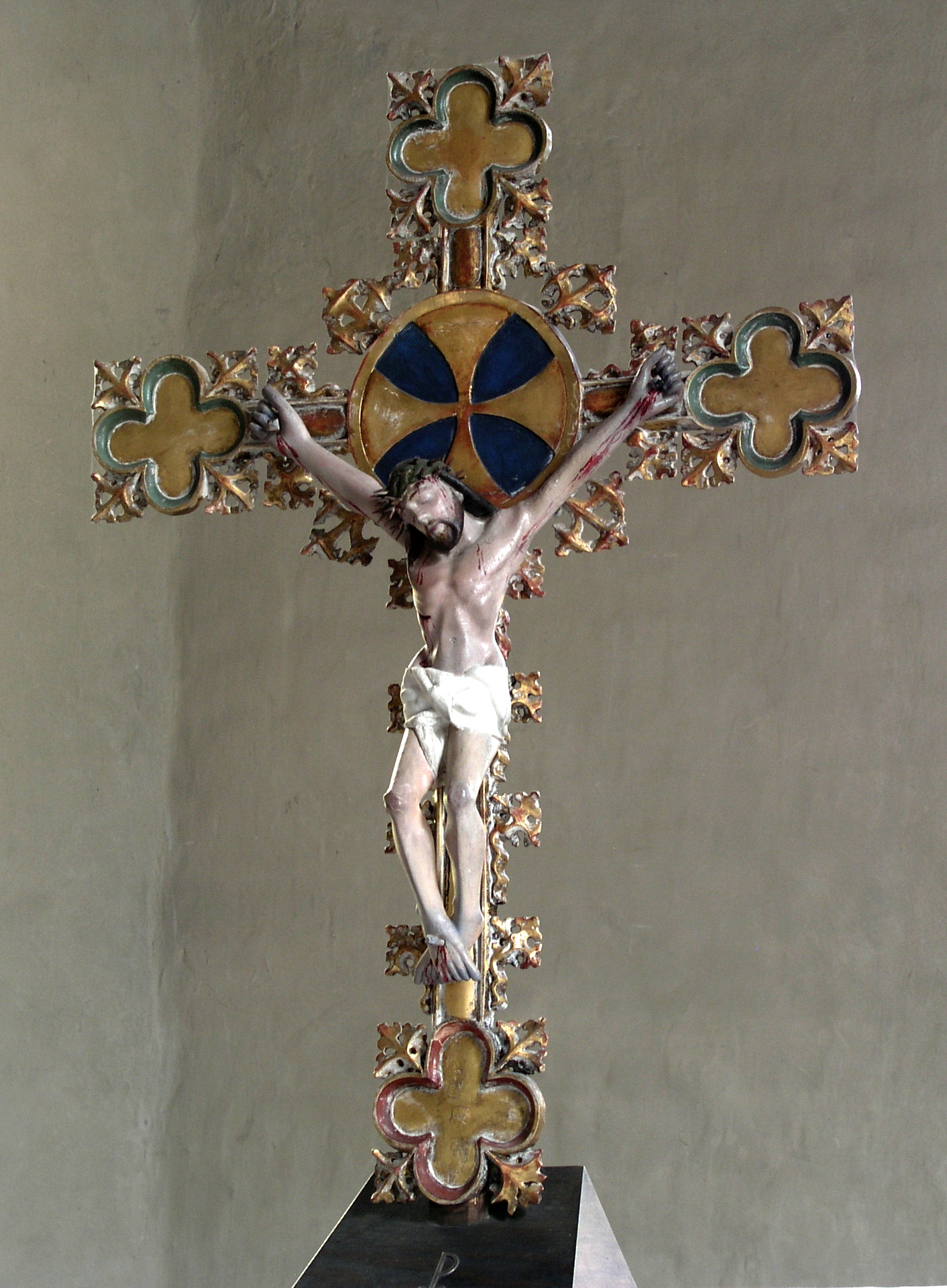
Crucifix

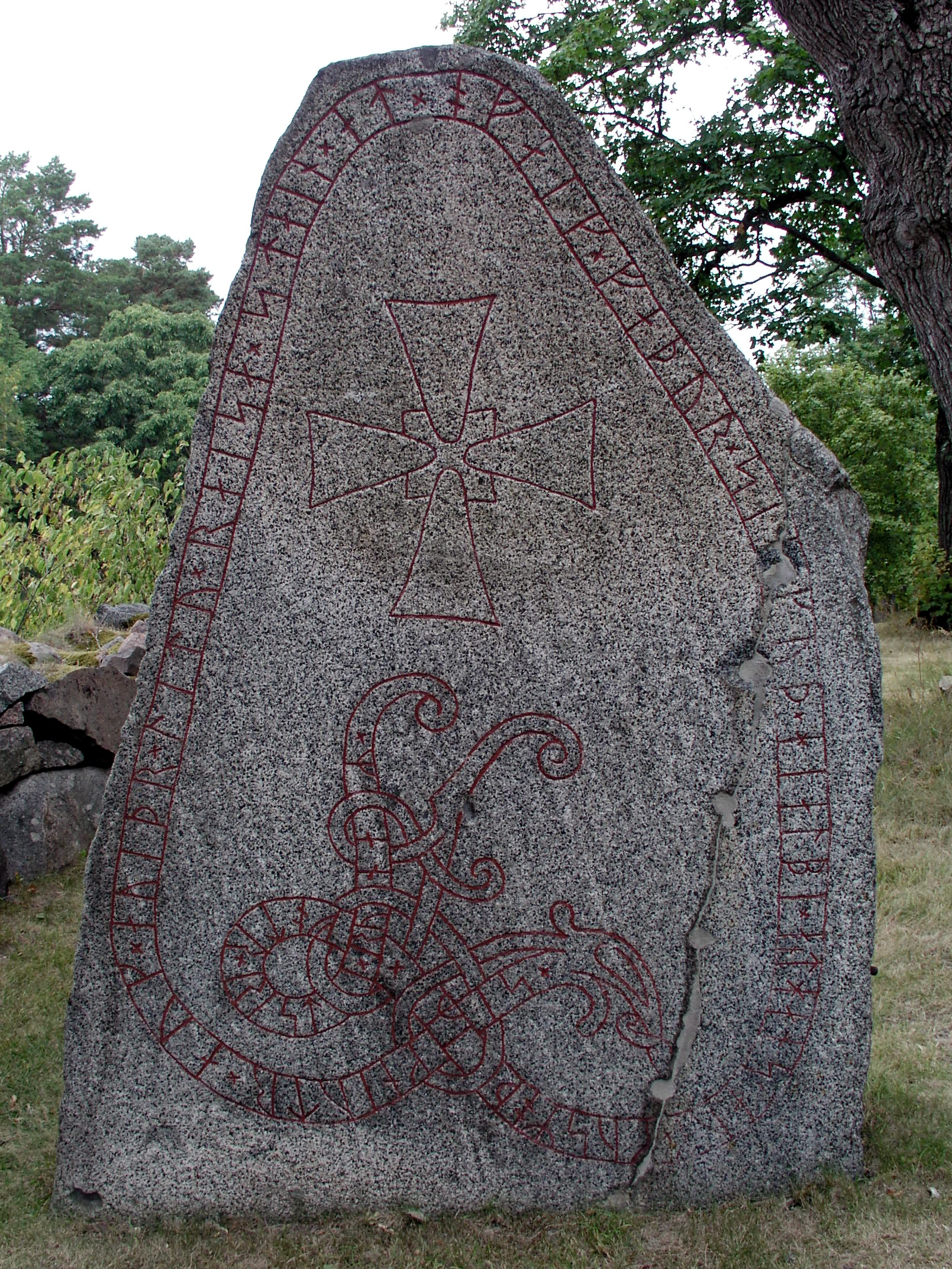
The runestone U 945

== Literature ==
- Våra kyrkor, p. 24, Klarkullens Förlag AB, Västervik, 1990, ISBN 91-971561-0-8
