= Almunge Church =

Church in Uppsala municipality

Coordinates: 59°51′59″N 18°04′06″E

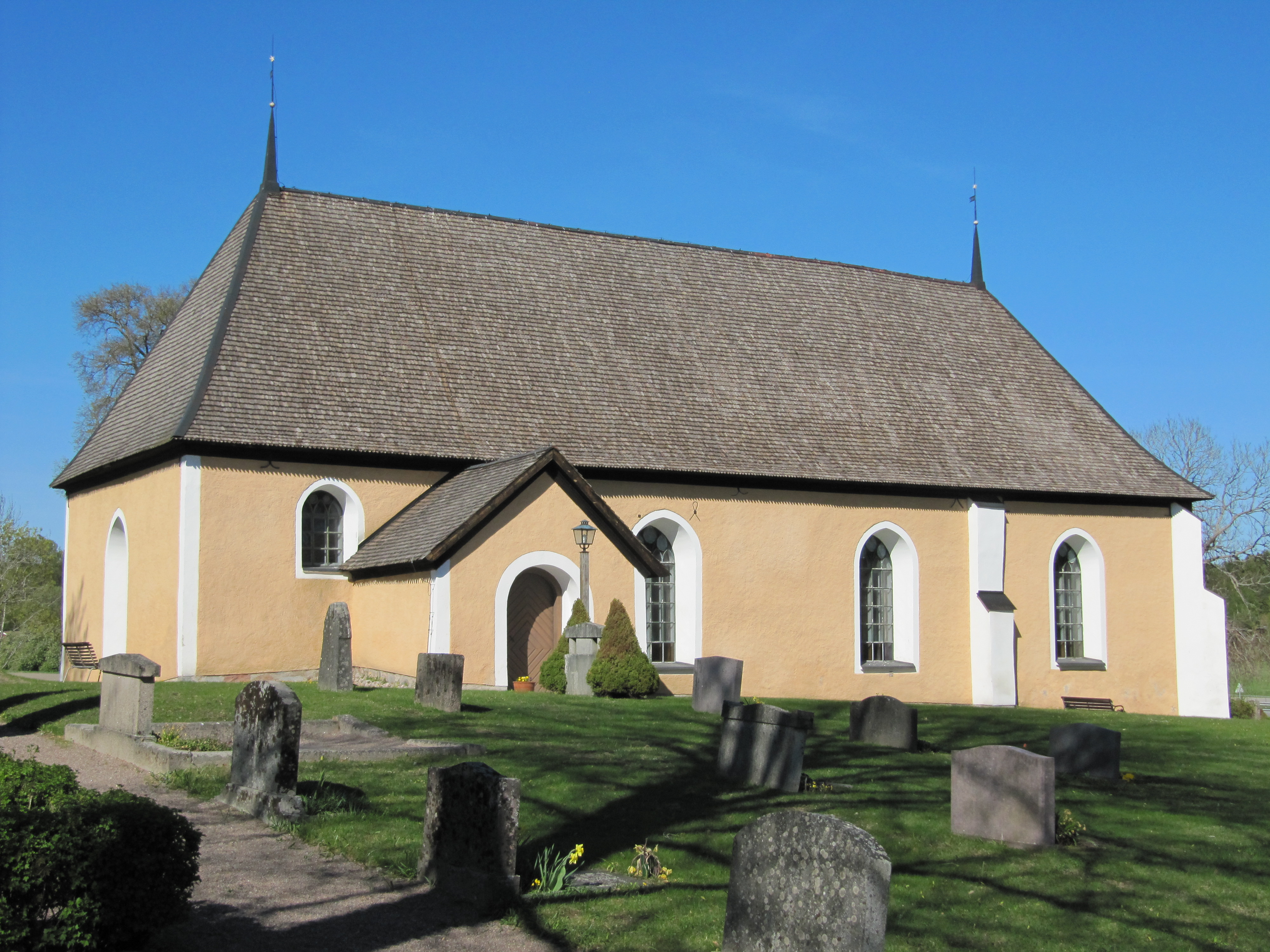
Almunge Church, view of the exterior

Almunge Church (Swedish: Almunge kyrka) is a Lutheran church at Almunge in Uppsala County, Sweden. The church is associated with the Archdiocese of Uppsala of the Church of Sweden.

== History and architecture ==
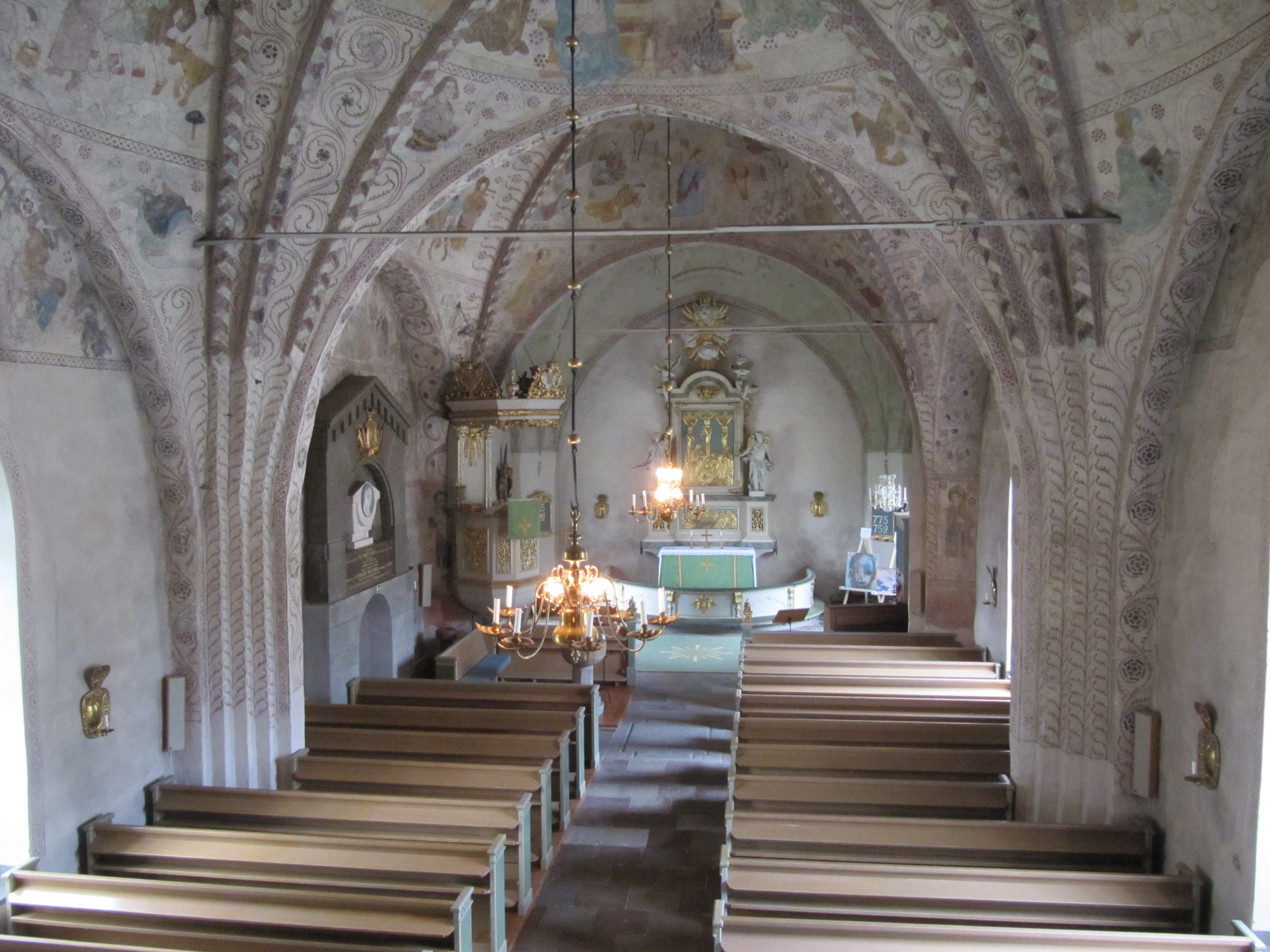
Interior

The history of Almunge Church is somewhat opaque; probably the church was built sometime between 1250 and 1350. The church porch is a later addition, probably built during the 15th century. During the same century the church was remade internally and equipped with brick vaulting, decorated with murals in the style of painter Albertus Pictor (ca.1440–1509). The church was enlarged during the 17th century with the presently visible choir and the external buttresses. During this time the paintings were also covered with whitewash but rediscovered and laid bare again in 1911. New windows were added and old ones enlarged during the 19th century. The organ façade is in neoclassical style designed in 1834 by architect Carl Gustaf Blom Carlsson (1799–1868).

Of the furnishings, the baptismal font dates to the medieval era. The altarpiece and the pulpit both date from the early 18th century. Both feature gold baroque trimming by German-Swedish sculptor Burchard Precht (1651–1738).
