= Gryta Church =

Coordinates: 59°44′27″N 17°20′52″E

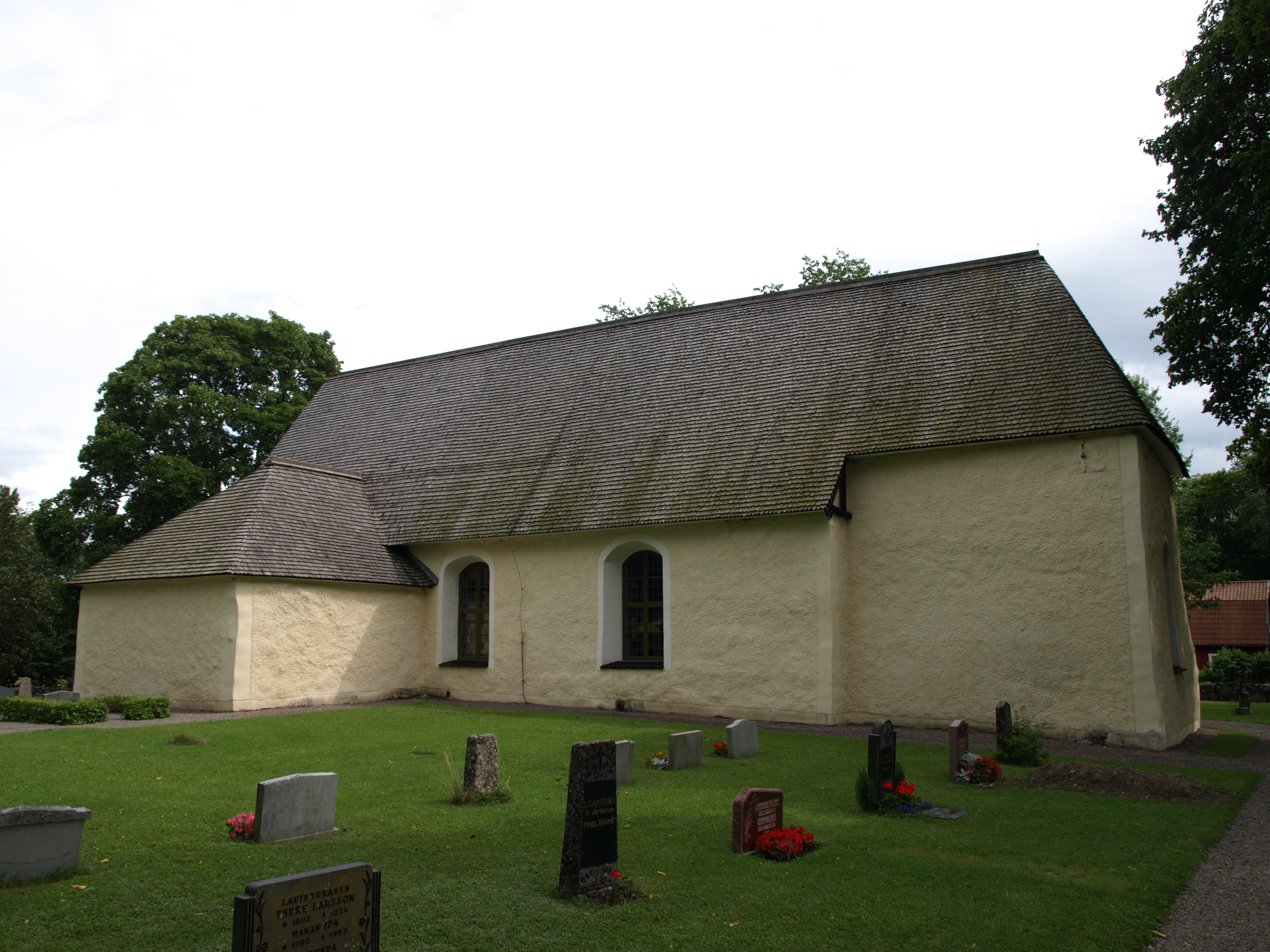
- Gryta Church
- Location: Uppsala
- Country: Sweden
- Denomination: Lutheran

Architecture
- Functional status: Active

Administration
- Province: Uppsala
- Archdiocese: Uppsala
- Parish: Gryta

Gryta Church (Swedish: Gryta kyrka) is a medieval Lutheran church located in a shallow valley about 2 km (1.2 mi) northeast of Örsundsbro, in the Archdiocese of Uppsala in Uppsala County, Sweden. A few hundred meters west of the church is Salnecke Castle, one of Sweden's best-preserved castles from the mid-17th century.

== History ==
Christianity made inroads in areas already in the 11th century, as the Christian crosses on rune stones in the area suggest. The first church building was probably made of wood. The building material of this single-nave church with a rounded apse is fieldstone. The church was enlarged sometime later, probably circa 1250–1350.

In 1578, the church was struck by lightning and consequently ravaged by fire; the rounded apse got its semicircular appearance probably from the time of reconstruction following this event. The bell tower has two bells, a large and a small one. The oldest surviving church council register from the mid-17th century mentions about repairs to the bell tower, built in 1752. In the 1770s the whole tower except the ground floor was demolished and the ceiling rebuilt so that the whole church might be covered by a flat-pitched roof. Originally the church had a stone tower, but the upper parts of this was dismantled in 1775 as it was in poor condition.

== Architecture ==
To the north of the church a vestry is located and to the south a church porch. Inside, the ceiling is supported by 15th-century brick vaults. Most of the furnishings are Rococo in style, dating from the mid-18th century. The western part of the church is where the remains of the tower are. The oldest parts are located in the nave and are probably from the Romanesque era. To the west of the nave, erected around the 12th century, is a narrower part of the building which forms lower part of the former tower. The sacristy is located on the church's north side. and the pulpit, acquired in 1697, was probably made by a carpenter at the site after a model of some neighboring church's pulpit, for the type itself and ornaments were fashionable in the 17th century.

=== Interior ===
The pulpit is the oldest part of the church's fixtures, procured in 1697. This piece is probably made by a local carpenter and modeled after a pulpit in some neighboring church. The style of the pulpit and the soft, smooth character of the ornamentation was popular at the middle of the 17th century. The sacristy is located on the church's north side.

== Paintings ==
The paintings preserved in the church are very well kept in the three-arched nave with the tower vault richly decorated with fragments of four scenes, although only two have been interpreted. The wall paintings are of course largely gone, partly as a result of the enlargement of the windows during the 1790s. The paintings are dated by an inscription on the south wall on the brackets atop the imposts of the first arches, which reads "Anno Domini 1487 die Marie (Mary's day)". The paintings have probably been made by a student of Albertus Pictor. They are painted in a style widely used throughout the Mälaren Valley during the second half of the 15th century. The most notable of these painters was Albert the Painter.

=== First arch ===
In the east part of the ceiling (to the left), is a painting of St. Gregorius and Mark the Evangelist, (to the right) and another of St. Ambrosius and Matthew the Apostle. In the south part of the ceiling (top part to the left), is the painting of St. Augustinus and John the Apostle and another (to the right) which depicts the creation of Eve. In the lowest part to the left stands the devil playing a bagpipe, and above this appears two pictures, the sacrifices of Cain and Abel, and Cain murdering his brother. To the right is the Moses and the burning bush. In the west part of the ceiling (to the left), Our Lord unites Adam and Eve and to the right is the Fall of man. In the bottom-most corner, as in the other arch, are found half-lengths of prophets coming out of a large bell shaped in flowers. In the upper part of the ceiling (to the left), is the depiction of the Expulsion from the Garden of Eden, and below the painting "When Adam dalf (dug) and Eve span (spun)". To the right of this is St. Hieronymus and Luke the Evangelist and below the Emperor Augustus kneeling before the Sibyls, heralding the birth of Christ.

=== Middle arch ===
In the east part of the ceiling is the painting Coronation of Mary including Christ with crown and orb with cross. In the south part of the ceiling (to the left) appears Delilah cutting Samson's hair. In the background is Goliath with his club, and to the right Samson Breaking the Lion's Jaw.

== Bell tower and bells ==
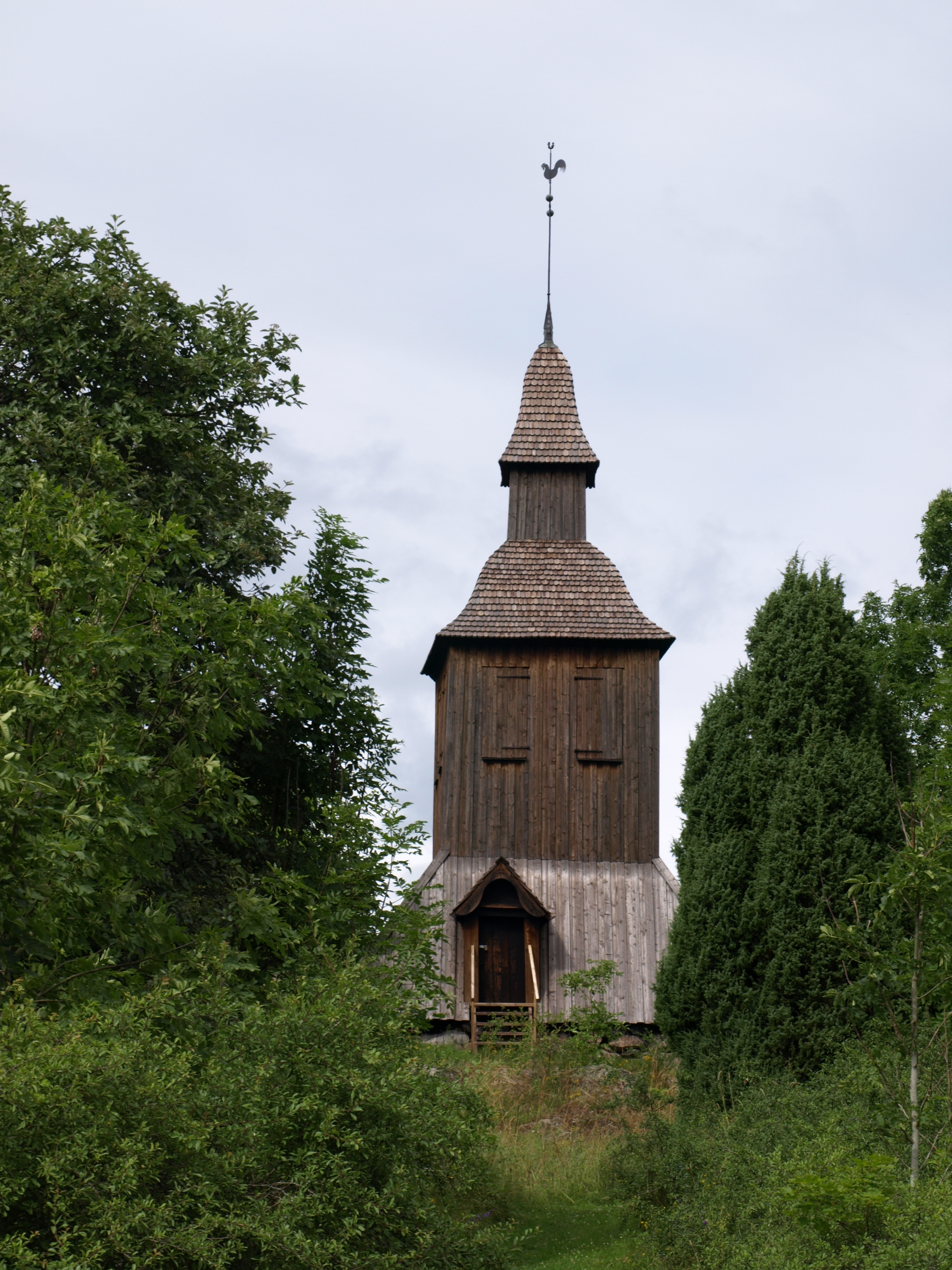
The bell tower of Gryta church

The bell tower at Gryta Church was built in 1752. In the oldest records of the church (from the middle of the 17th century), notations are made about repairs to the tower. In the modern records about the church, the bell tower, made of tarred wood, is noted to be of special interest since it is an original 18th-century tower. It has two bells, the Great Bell (Storklockan) and the Small Bell (Lillklockan).

== Cemetery ==
A great part of the cemetery, surrounded by a gray stone wall with deciduous plants encrusted in it, is covered with grass and walkways all paved with gravel. Close to the north of the vestry lies two blocks of graves with stone frames. The oldest graves are located immediately south and west of the church. Some with cast iron tracery.

The cemetery has been expanded several times to the north with the latest enlargement bounded to the north and east of the Gunnebo fencing. A newly built memorial is also situated here. About a hundred yards north of the church stands the belfry which is likely to have been built in 1752. The lower part of the belfry has inclined walls with tarred panels. These are contingent constructions with diagonal pledged works. The cemetery's southeast corner is occupied by the Spenska chapel, a building in neoclassical style with plastered facades colored in yellow lime build around 1802.
