= Yttergran Church =

Medieval church in Sweden

Coordinates: 59°36′05″N 17°30′17″E

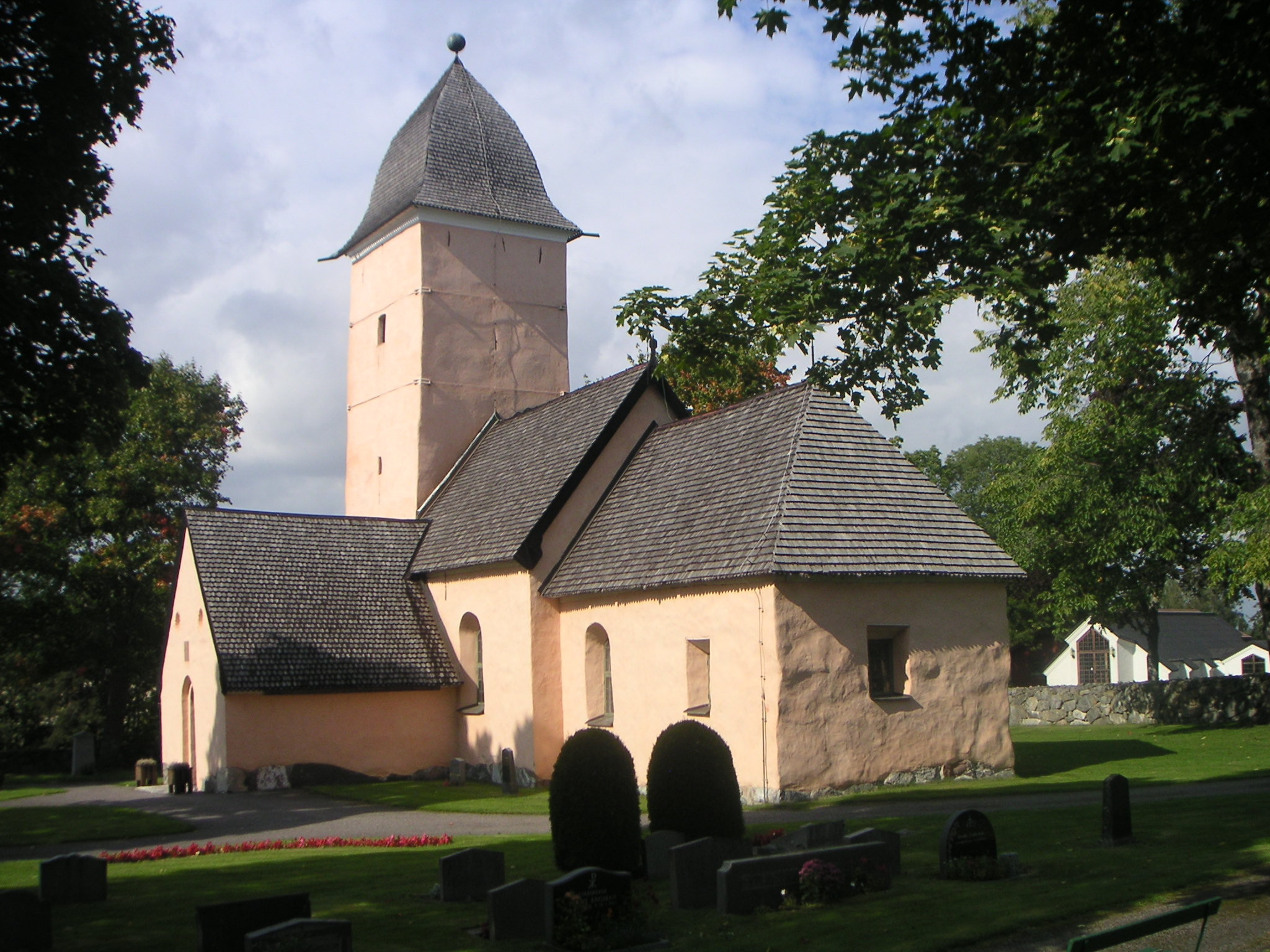
Yttergran Church, external view

Yttergran Church (Swedish: Yttergrans kyrka) is a medieval Lutheran church in the Archdiocese of Uppsala in Uppsala County, Sweden.

== History ==
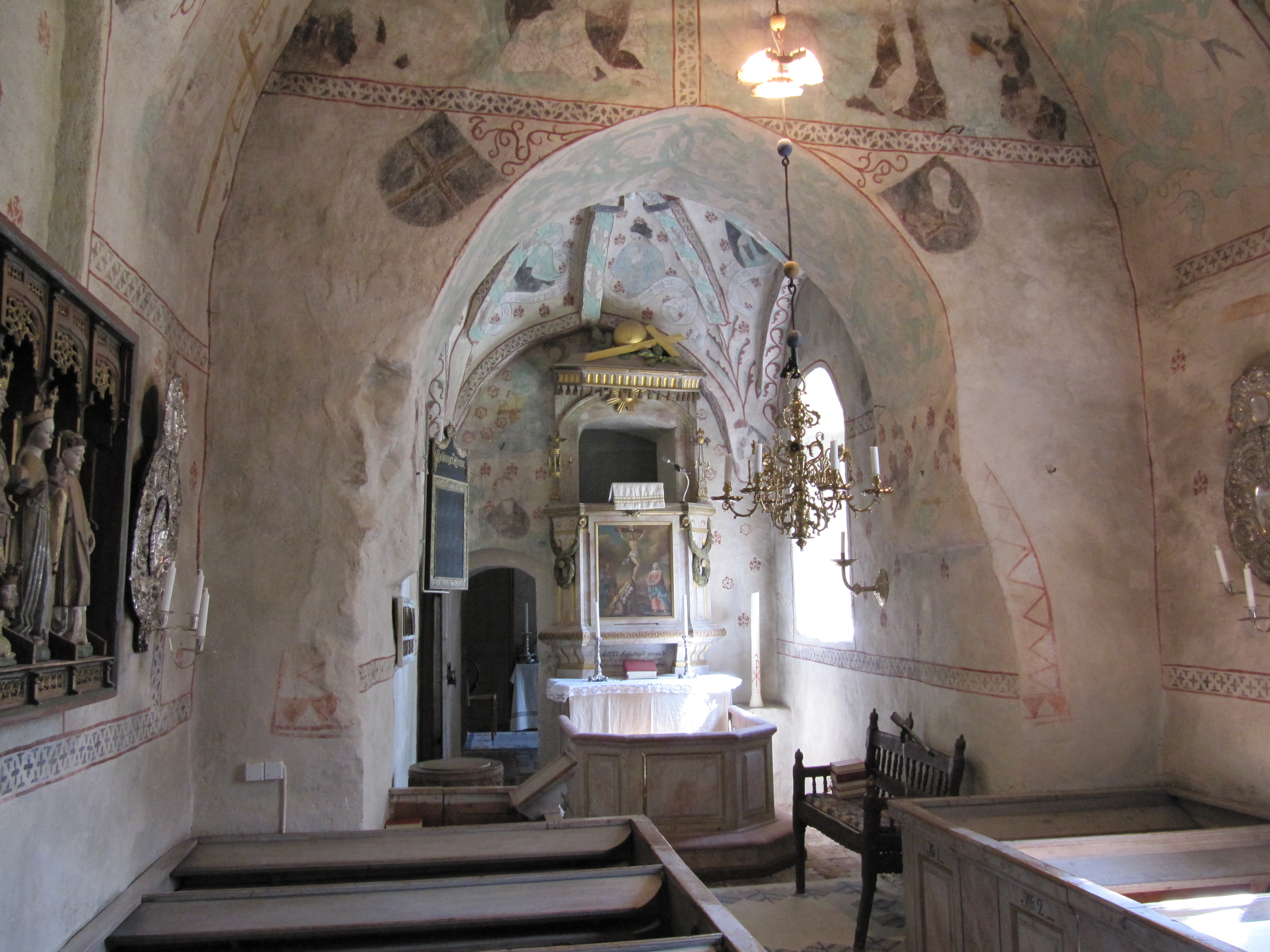
Interior view towards the choir

The church dates from the early Middle Ages and may have been built as a private church, belonging to a farmstead. According to a local legend, the church was commissioned by two sisters on a nearby farm. The oldest parts of the church are the nave and choir, in Romanesque style and possibly dating from the second half of the 12th century. The church originally also had an apse, but it was torn down following a devastating fire in the 1720s. The tower is somewhat later, erected in the 13th century but the spire or tower roof is considerably later, dating from 1773-75. During the 14th and 15th centuries, changes were made inside the church, e.g. by vaulting the ceiling. During the 15th century the church porch or so-called weapon-house, has added.

Adjacent to the church is an external wooden bell tower, built in 1763-66, and a burial chapel designed by architect Bengt Romare and built in 1954.

== Architecture ==
The church is the smallest church in the archdiocese of Uppsala. The interior is dominated by a number of medieval frescos. Of these, a few date from the 14th century but the majority are from the 15th century and executed by the well-known master Albertus Pictor. The frescos include a portrait of Jakob Ulvsson, archbishop of Uppsala and founder of Uppsala University. The bishop is depicted kneeling next to his coat of arms. The archbishop owned the nearby Biskops-Arnö Castle and it is probable that the entire decoration of the church by Albertus Pictor was commissioned by Jakob Ulvsson. The frescos were painted over with whitewash at a later stage but rediscovered and laid bare during a renovation in 1927.

Among the furnishings, the baptismal font remains but in a damaged state. It dates from the 12th century and was probably made on Gotland. The church also has a partly preserved medieval altarpiece dating from c. 1470-80. The altar and pulpit however date from 1777 and are Rococo in style. They are a peculiar combination of altar and pulpit in one.
