= Albertus Pictor =

Swedish painter (c. 1440 – c. 1507)

- Albrekt Pärlstickare
- Born: c. 1440; Immenhausen
- Died: c. 1507 (aged 66–67)
- Known for: Painting
- Notable work: Death playing chess
- Movement: Swedish Renaissance

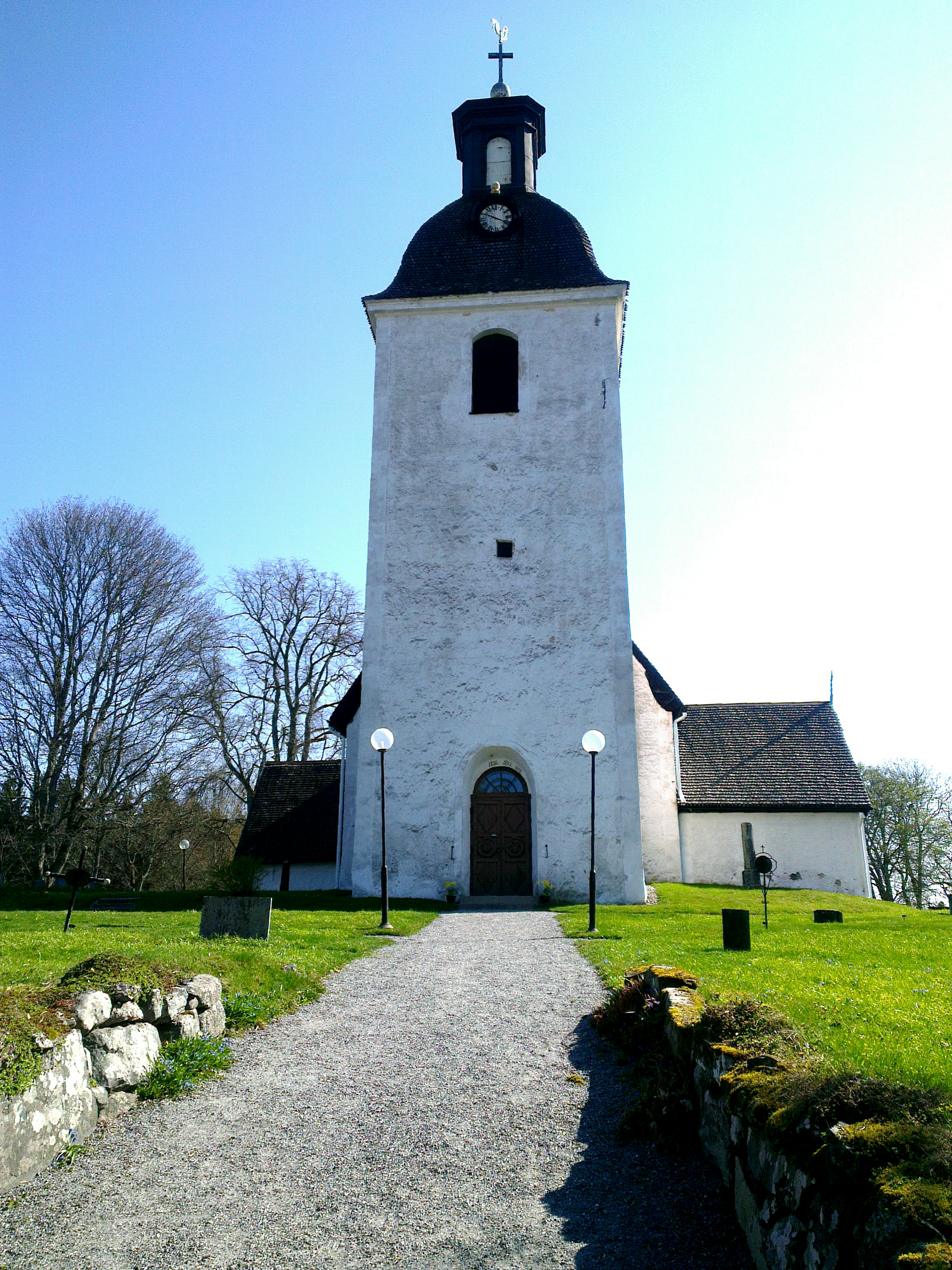
Albertus Pictor decorated the church of Husby-Sjutolft, Sweden.

Albertus Pictor (English, "Albert the Painter"; Immenhusen, c. 1440 – c. 1507), also called Albert Pictor, Albert Målare and Albrekt Pärlstickare (Swedish), is the most famous late medieval Swedish painter, known for his wallpaintings surviving in numerous churches in southern and central Sweden. Celebrations for the quincentenary of his death were arranged for 2009.

== Career ==
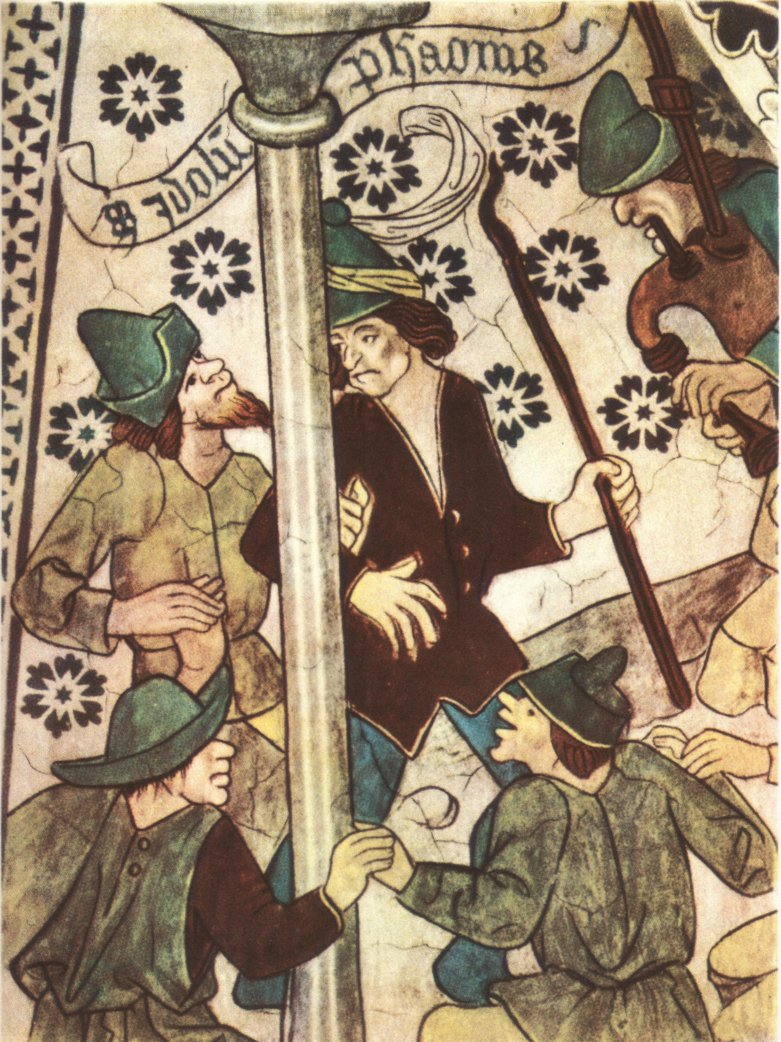
Dancing peasants by Albertus Pictor, Härkeberga Church, Uppland, c. 1480.

Albertus was originally called Albertus Immenhusen, after the German town of Immenhausen in Hessen of which he was a native. He occurs in Swedish historical sources from 1465, when he was admitted a burgher of Arboga. Eight years later he moved to Stockholm, where, in accordance with current practice, he took over the workshop as well as the widow of a deceased painter.

He was a versatile and prolific artist, known to his contemporaries not only for his church wallpaintings, but also as an organist and embroiderer (hence his nickname of Pärlstickare, "Pearl-embroiderer"). More than thirty of his schemes, mostly in a secco technique, are extant, many in the Lake Mälaren region, about a third of which bear his signature. Notable examples include wallpaintings at Bromma kyrka, near Stockholm, Lid kyrka, in Södermanland and Täby Kyrkby kyrka in Täby. Part of his life and work are depicted in the illustrated book, "Albert målare och sommaren i Härkeberga" ("Albert the Painter and the summer in Härkeberga"), which describes his painting of the small church of Härkeberga in Uppland (see below).

== Bergman inspiration ==
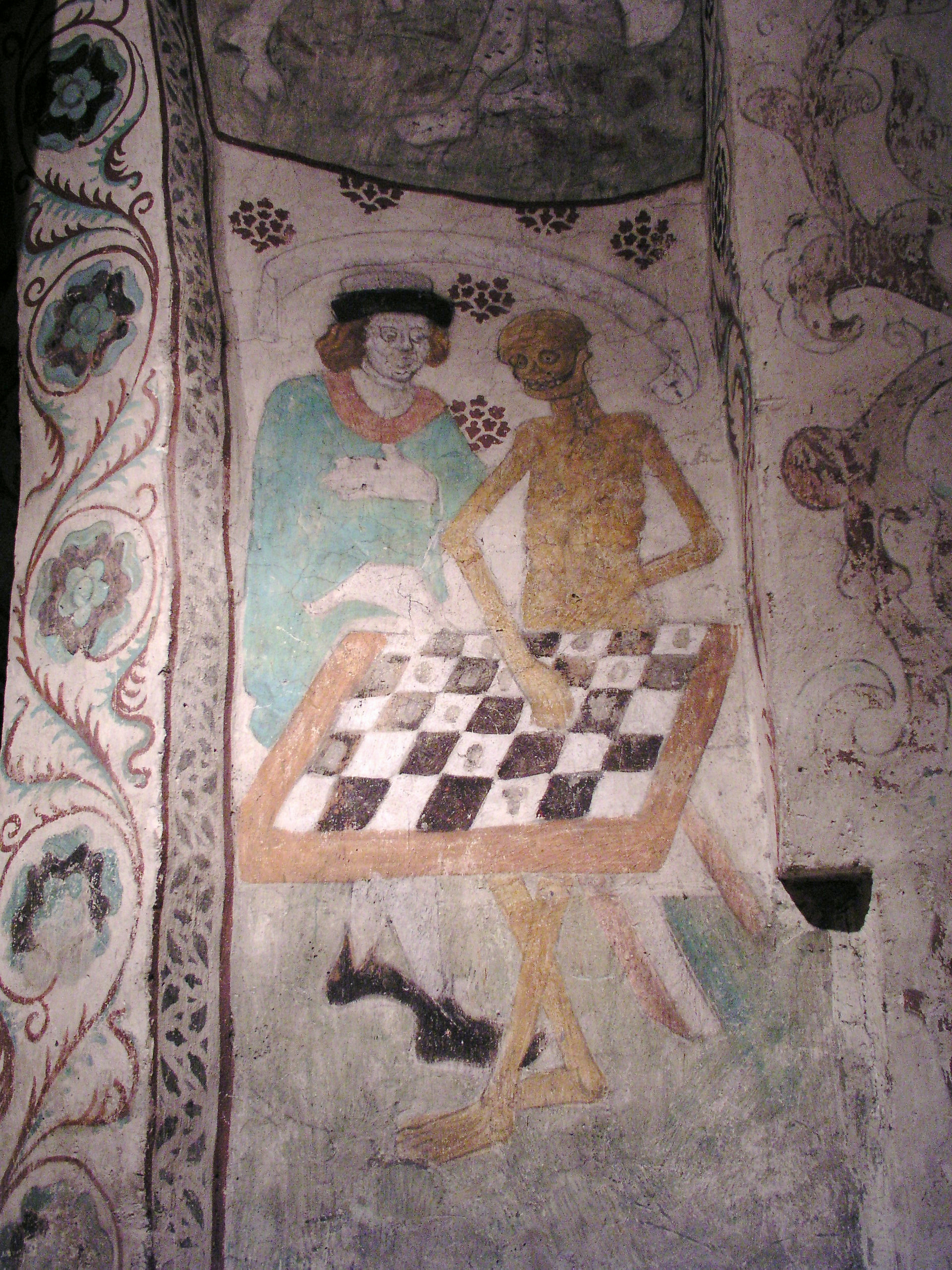
Death playing chess by Albertus Pictor. Täby kyrka, Diocese of Stockholm.

Albertus's illustration of Death playing chess from Täby kyrka inspired the famous scene in Ingmar Bergman's 1957 film The Seventh Seal in which a knight (Antonius Block/Max von Sydow) plays chess with personified Death. Albertus Pictor himself appears as a character in the film (played by Gunnar Olsson), in a dialog with Jöns, Antonius Block's squire, while working on a church mural.

== Churches with wall paintings by or attributed to Albertus Pictor ==
Albertus Pictor's paintings are considered preserved in 37 churches. Nine of the painting are either signed with some variant of Albertus name or the signing documented was destroyed. Other paintings ascribed to Albertus Pictor are based on attributes made by experts on the subject. Attenuation on stylistic grounds based on comparisons to those of the churches that have secure signings is difficult to determine especially when it concerns the making of the works.

The ornamentation has traditionally been important for the attribution, it is, however, in greater part in the public domain and is more general in its expression and easier to copy than figure painting. A lot of them are also strong influenced by over-liming and production with subsequent restoration. Albertus Pictor's painting, however, differ so much from contemporary Swedish painters that they usually can not be attributed to the author. It is conceivable that in some cases they rather have strong influences.

- Almunge (Uppland)
- Bromma (Stockholm)
- Bälinge (Uppland)
- Danmark (Uppland)
- Dingtuna (Västmanland)
- Ed (Uppland)
- Floda (Södermanland)
- Gryta (Uppsala)
- Helga Trefaldighet (Uppsala)
- Husby-Sjutolft (Uppland)
- Håbo-Tibble (Uppland)
- Härkeberga (Uppland)
- Härnevi (Uppland)
- Kalmar (Uppland)
- Kumla (Västmanland)
- Lid (Sörmland)
- Nederluleå (Norrbotten)
- Odensala (Uppland)
- S Per (Uppsala)
- Sala (Västmanland)
- Sollentuna (Uppland)
- Solna (Uppland)
- Storkyrkan (Stockholm)
- Torshälla (Södermanland)
- Täby (Uppland)
- Uppsala Cathedral (Uppland)
- Vadsbro (Södermanland)
- Vaksala (Uppland)
- Vansö (Sörmland)
- Vittinge (Uppland)
- Vårdinge (Södermanland)
- Vänge (Uppland)
- Västerås Cathedral (Västmanland)
- Yttergran (Uppland)
- Ösmo (Sörmland)
- Österunda (Uppland)
- Övergran (Uppland)

== See also ==
- Church frescos in Sweden
