= Härkeberga Church =

Coordinates: 59°41′34″N 17°11′16″E

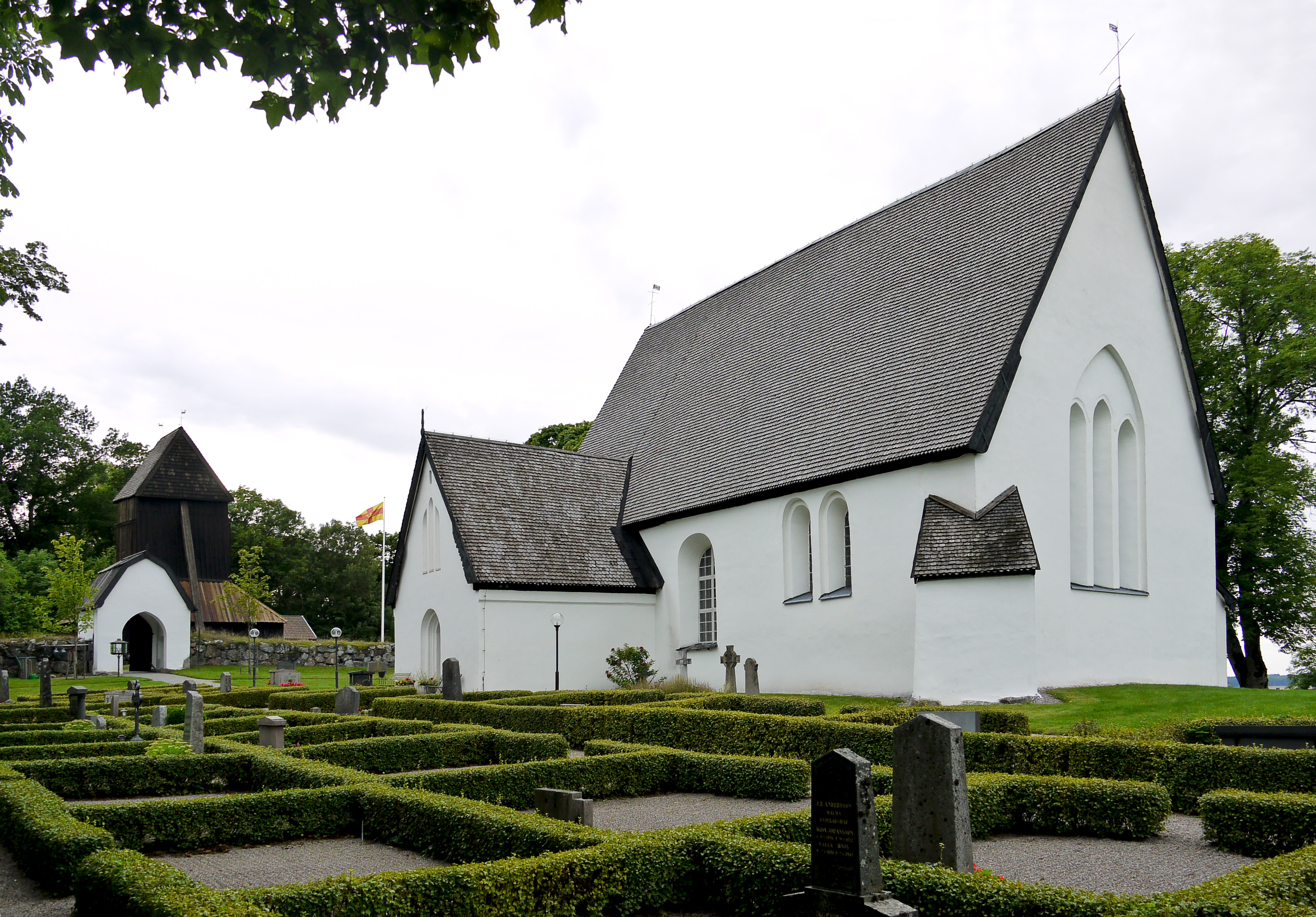
Härkeberga Church, external view

Härkeberga Church (Swedish: Härkeberga kyrka) is a Lutheran church in the Archdiocese of Uppsala in Uppsala County, Sweden. It contains a number of well-preserved 15th-century frescos attributed to Albertus Pictor.

== History ==
Härkeberga Church is built in an old cultural landscape, and close to the church archaeological discoveries have been made of objects from the Bronze Age and Iron Age. The church itself dates from the early 14th century. Few alterations have been made to the original building. The vestry and the main body of the church are original. In the 15th century, a church porch, a single buttress was added and the interior embellished with brick vault, adorned with frescos by Albertus Pictor. It is for his wallpaintings in fresco-secco technique that the church is most well known. Since then, no major alterations have been made to the church.

== Architecture ==
The church is a hall church with two windows in the southern wall and a group of three windows in the eastern wall of the choir, all original but later (18th century) enlarged. The attached vestry is original and contains traces of 14th century frescos, imitating masonry. A door with medieval iron decoration connects the church porch (c. 1480) and the church, and in the entrance door traces of the original, medieval cloth that once covered the door remain. Internally, the church is embellished with richly decorated vaults, created by Albertus Pictor.

The frescos date from around 1480 and are unusually well-preserved, since they have not been covered with whitewash or painted over. In the vault above the choir, the instruments of the Passion are depicted, held by angels. Above the altar is Christ with bleeding wounds. In the rest of the church there are stories from the Old Testament, but also secular motifs, like the Wheel of Fortune. In addition, demons, imaginary animals and beasts are represented throughout the church. Although the work is not signed, it can be attributed to Albertus Pictor on stylistic grounds. The frescos in Härkeberga Church are considered by some to be Pictor's finest and most well-preserved work.

Most of the church furnishings date from the 18th century, including the pulpit, considered an unusually fine piece made by Jean Baptiste Masreliez in 1791. The triumphal cross is as old as the church itself, probably made for it when it was new.

The church stands in a cemetery, surrounded by a low wall. The gate in the wall is probably medieval but redesigned during the 18th century. The wooden bell tower is from the 17th century; the church has never had a stone tower.

== Gallery of frescos ==
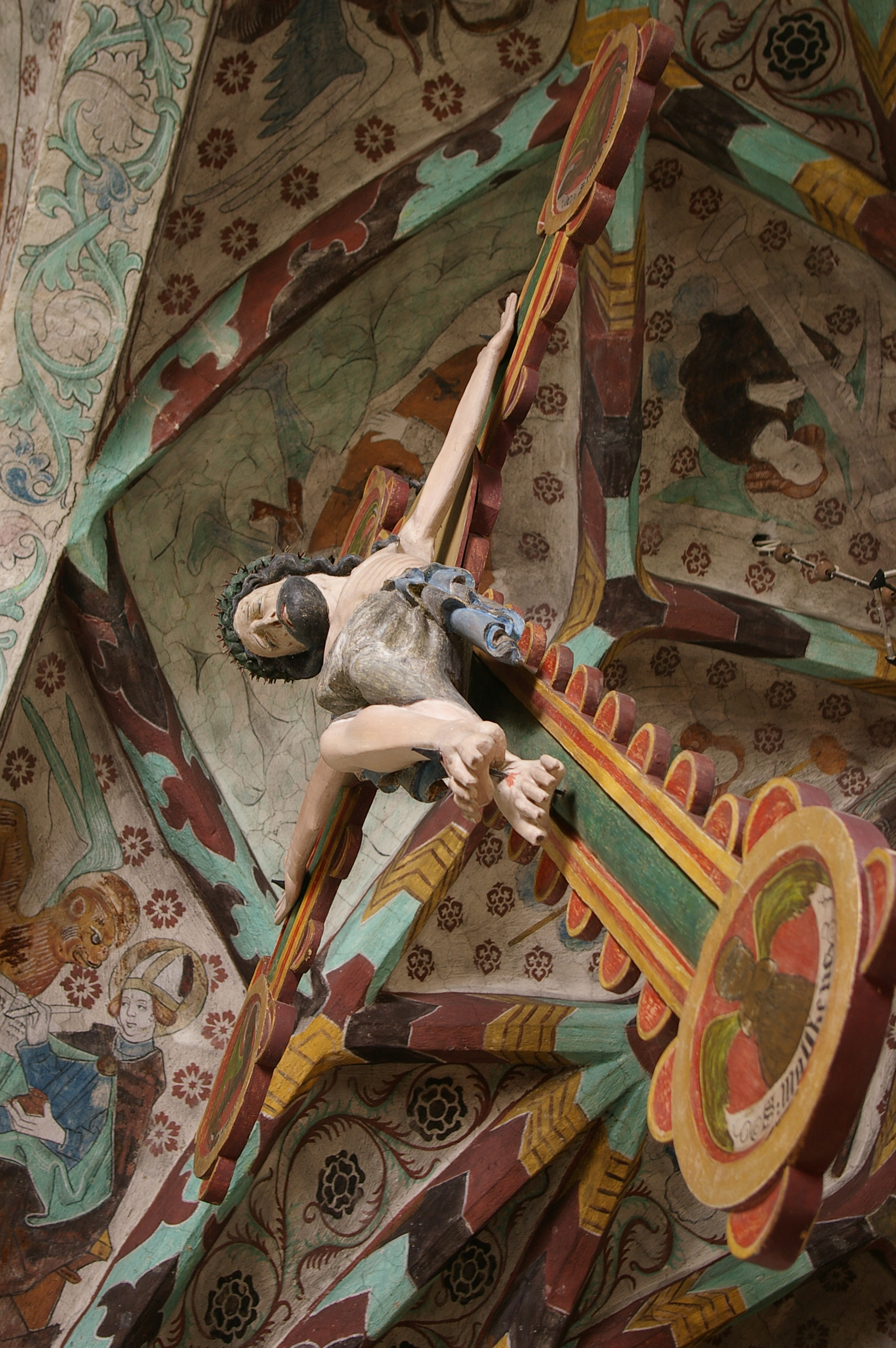
View of the triumphal cross, hanging beneath the decorated vault

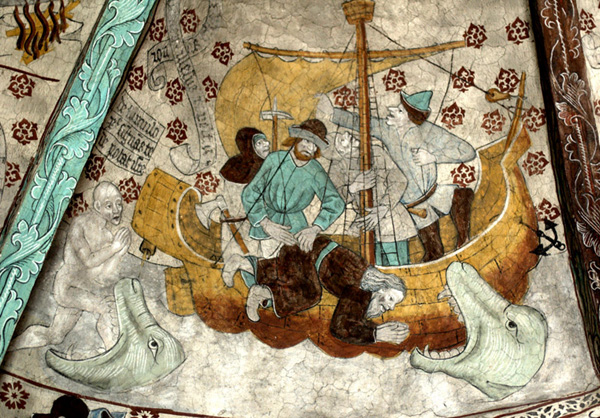
Jonah and the Whale

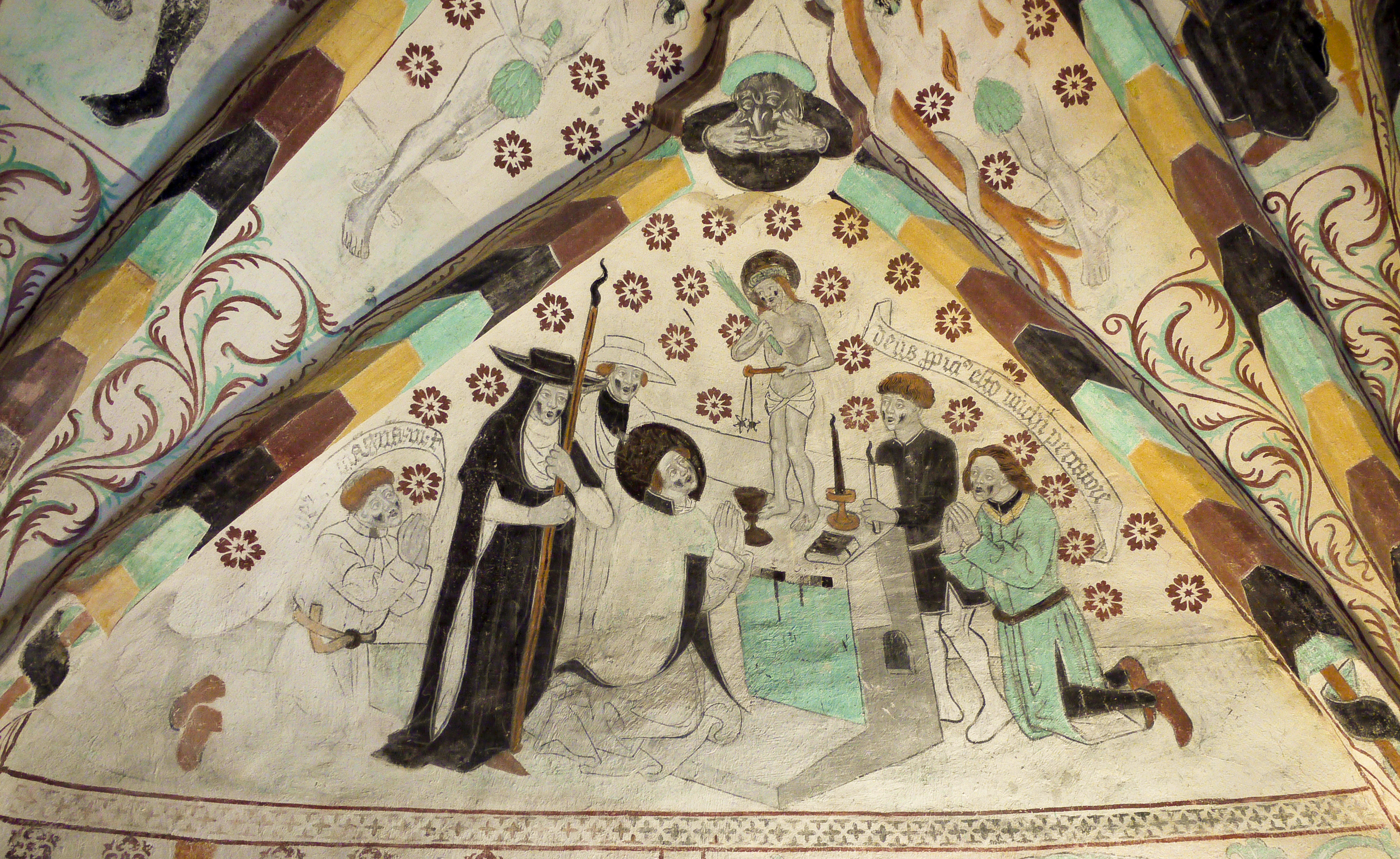
Mass of Saint Gregory

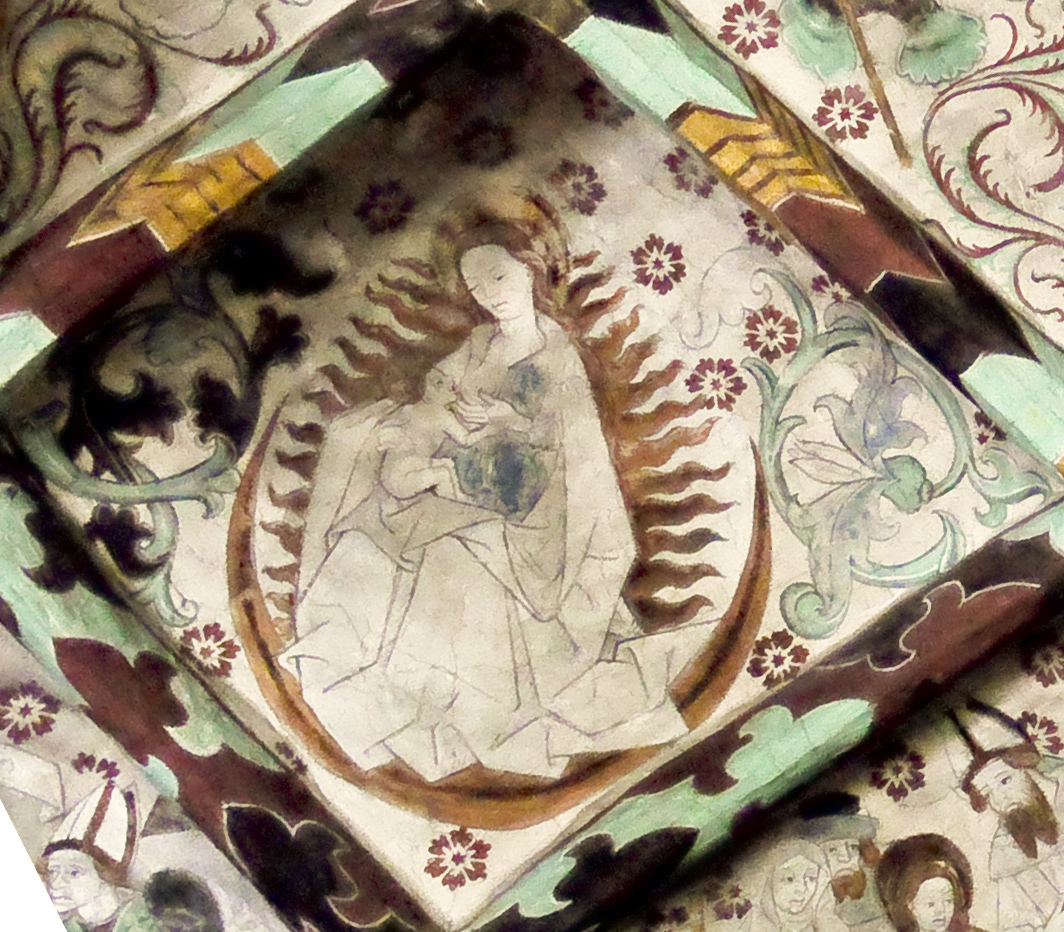
The holy Virgin

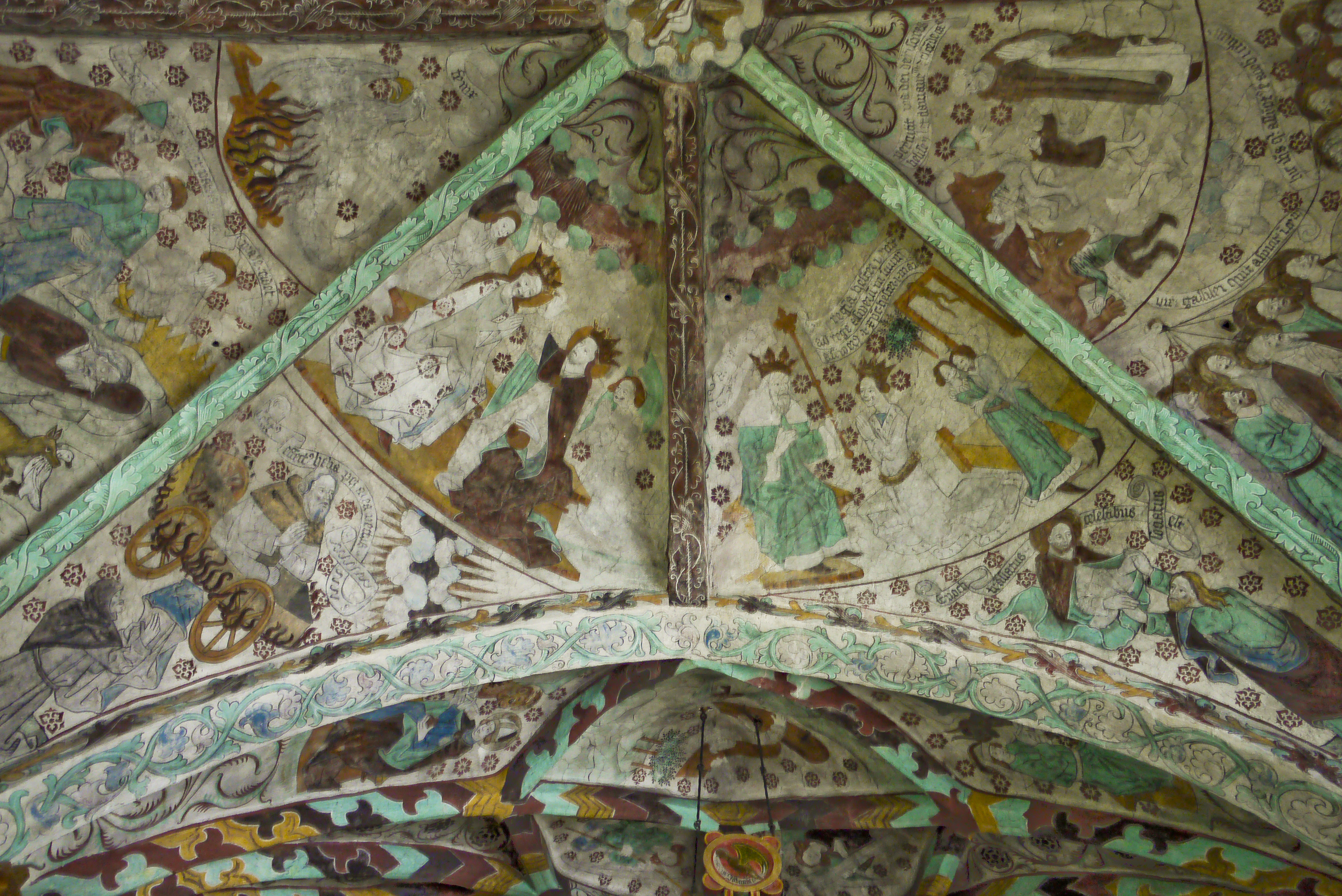
View of one of the vaults

== See also ==
- Church murals in Sweden
