= Täby Church =

Coordinates: 59°29′27″N 18°03′24″E

- Täby kyrka
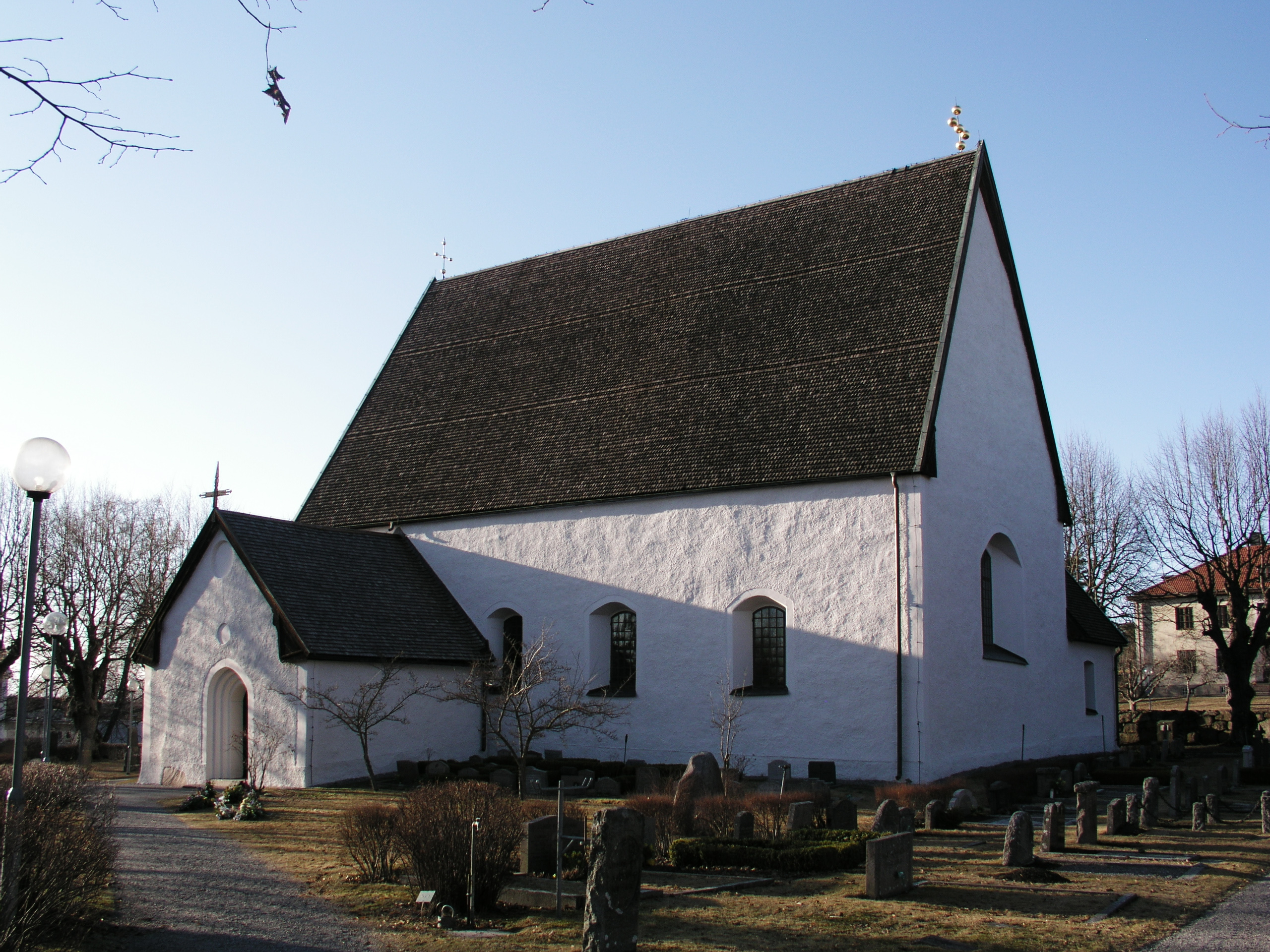
- External view of the church
- Täby Church
- Location: Täby kyrkby
- Country: Sweden
- Denomination: Church of Sweden

Administration
- Diocese: Stockholm
- Parish: Täby

Täby Church (Swedish: Täby kyrka) is a medieval church in Täby Municipality, in the province of Uppland north of Stockholm. The church is best known for its painted walls and ceilings by Albertus Pictor.

== History ==
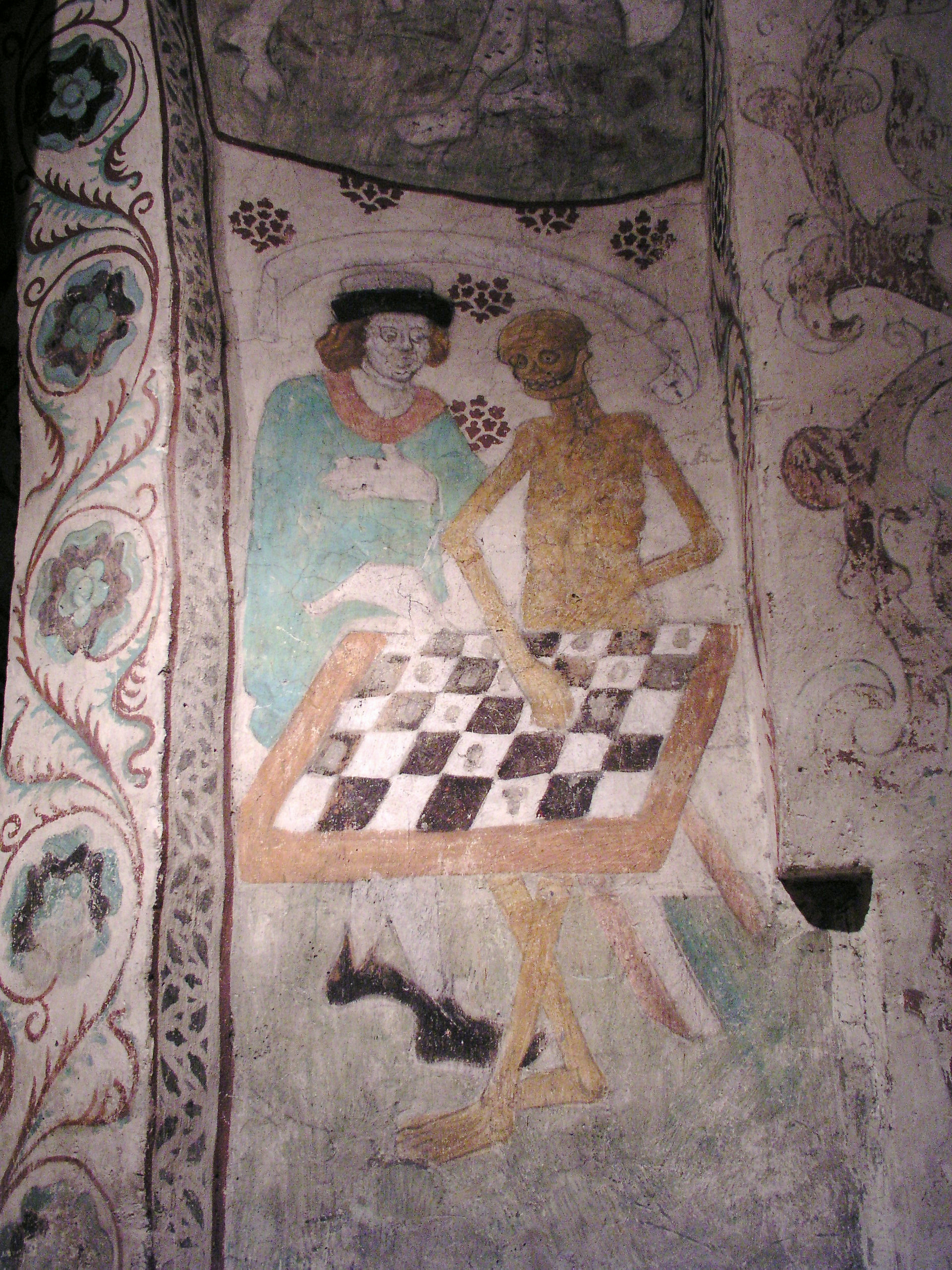
Man playing chess with death

The church was built during the second half of the 13th century. It was first constructed as a square hall church. In the mid-14th century a vestry was added and about 100 years later the church porch was built. During the second half of the 15th century, the flat wooden ceiling was replaced by a vaulted ceiling. The altarpiece dates from the 1470s. A runestone is immured in the church porch.

== Paintings ==
The church is decorated with mural paintings by Albertus Pictor, one of Sweden's preeminent medieval painters, who died in 1511. Pictor's ceiling frescos are from the 1480s and, unlike many of his other works, were never whitewashed over. They include a picture of a man playing chess with Death, a motif that inspired Ingmar Bergman to a famous scene in the movie The Seventh Seal. The motif is very unusual, known only from one other source.

The main inspiration for the paintings was Biblia Pauperum, a collection of events from the Holy Bible. The church, together with the frescos, was comprehensively restored in 1994.

== Furnishings ==
The altarpiece from the 1470s depicts the Golgotha scene and is flanked by a sculpture of St. Olof. The pulpit is from the 1630s and was originally placed in the chapel of the former Castle of Stockholm.

== Gallery ==
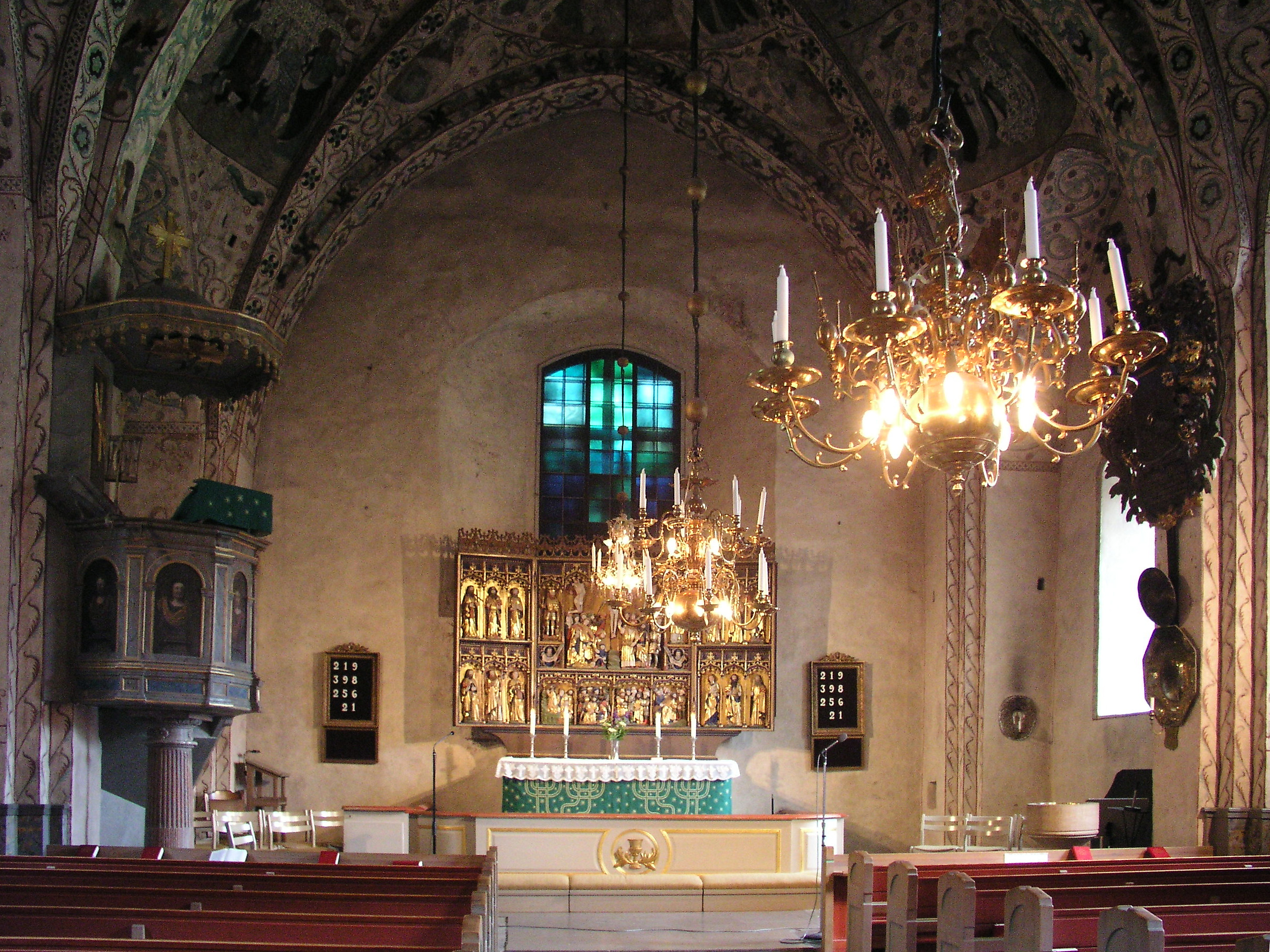
Interior view towards the altar

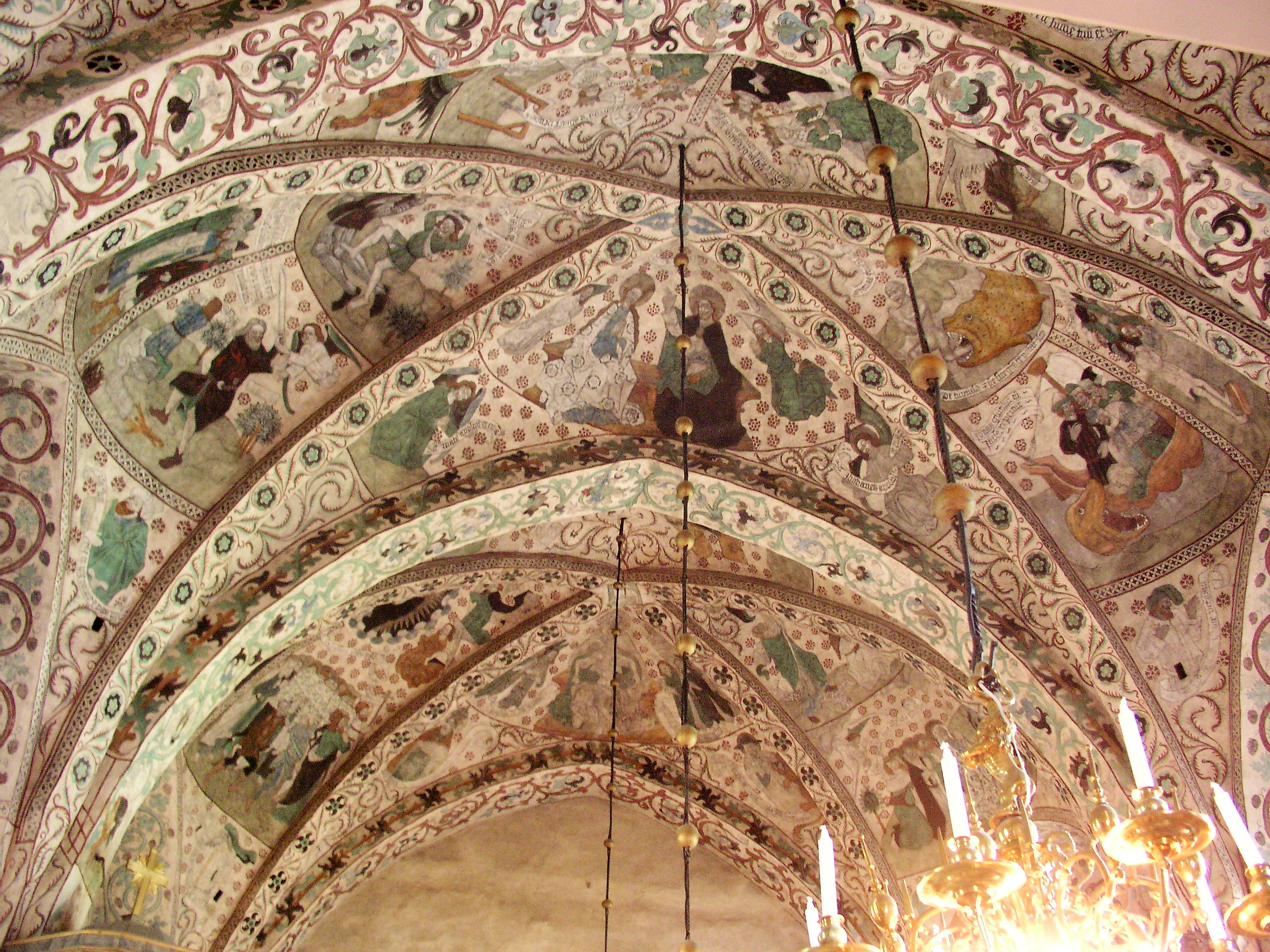
The decorated vaults

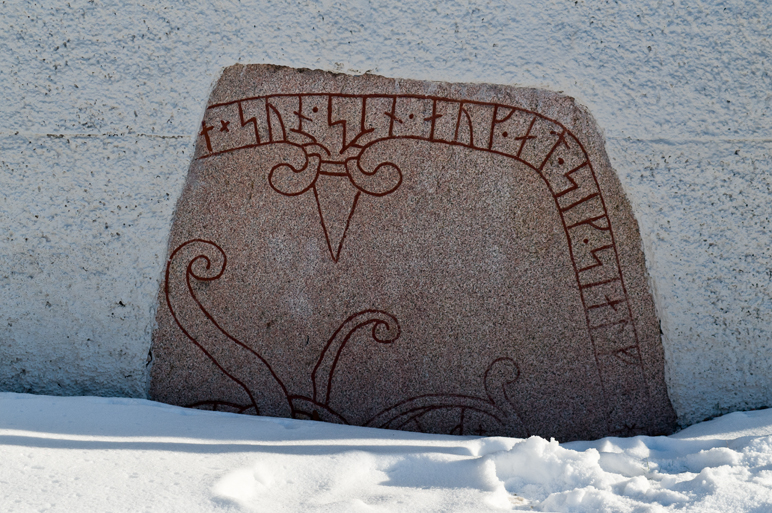
Runestone immured in the church porch
