= Ed Church, Uppland =

Church in Stockholm County, Sweden

Coordinates: 59°30′28″N 17°52′05″E

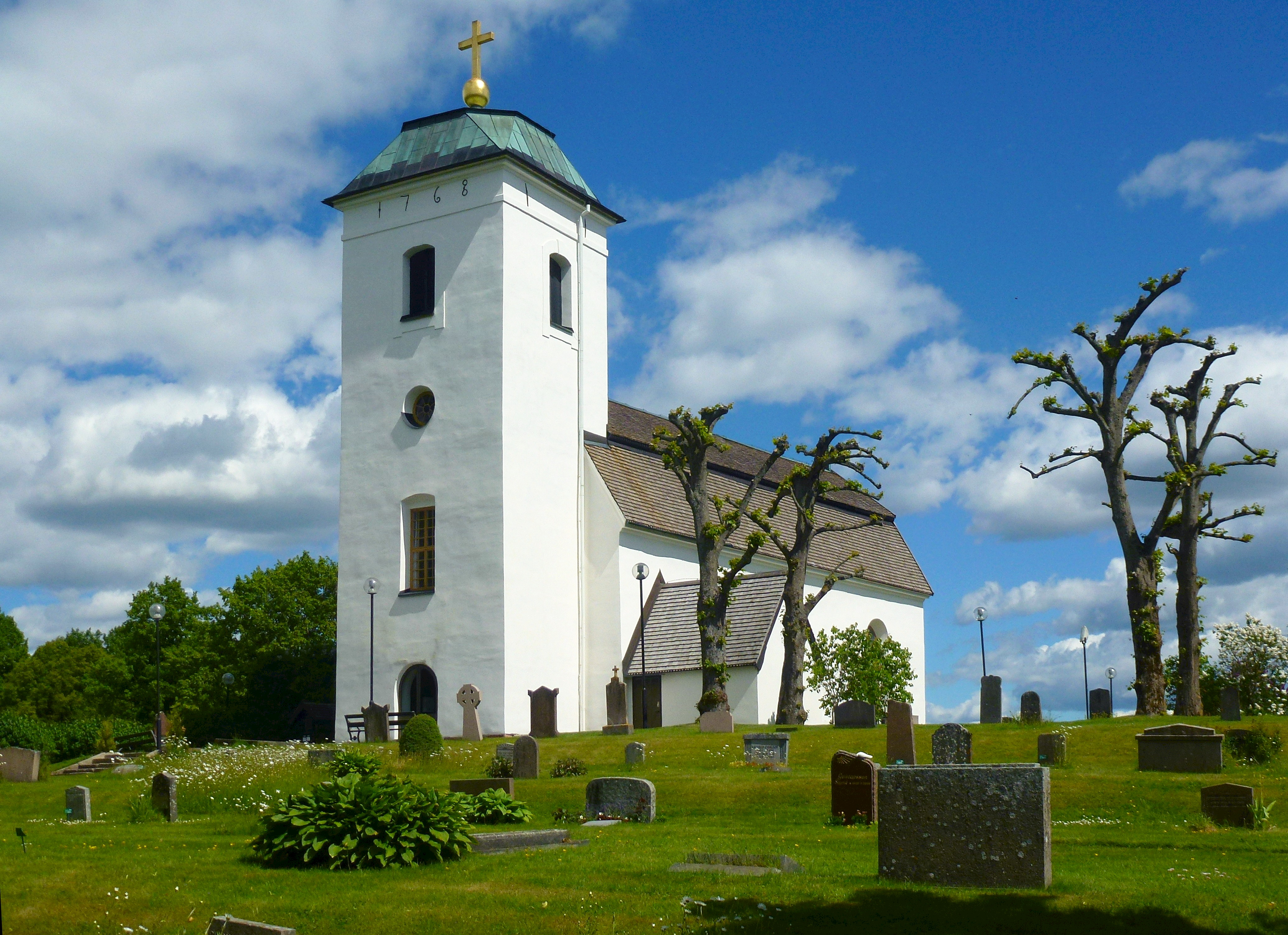
Ed Church, external view

Ed Church (Swedish: Eds kyrka) is a Lutheran church about 3 km southwest of the centre of Upplands Väsby, Stockholm County, Sweden. It belongs to the Diocese of Stockholm. It is a listed building, protected by law.

== History and architecture ==
Construction of the church started in the 12th century, and it was expanded during the 14th and 15th centuries. In 1487, the interior of the church was decorated with frescos by Albertus Pictor. During Catholic times, the church was dedicated to Saint Olaf.

Reconstruction works were carried out in 1768. The tower was made higher, the windows enlarged and several medieval elements removed. The frescos were covered with whitewash. Architect Jean Eric Rehn designed parts of the new interior elements, notably the pulpit. The reconstruction was supported by Charles De Geer, who also supported reconstruction works at nearby Hammarby and Fresta churches. The external similarities between Fresta and Ed churches are striking.

A renovation was made in 1917-18 by architect Sigurd Curman, who at the time lived in the parish. He uncovered the medieval frescos and commissioned artist Olle Hjortzberg to make additional frescos for the 18th-century vaults. Hjortzberg also designed the new stained glass windows.
