= Refugee controversy in Sjöbo =

1988 referendum about accepting refugees in Sjöbo, Sweden

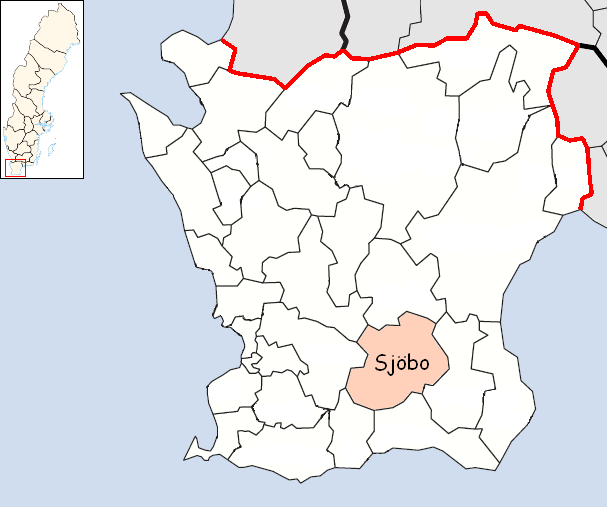
Sjöbo is a municipality in the Swedish county of Scania with around 18,100 inhabitants

The refugee controversy in Sjöbo, Sweden are the surrounding events of the 1988 referendum that banned Sjöbo Municipality from admitting foreign refugees. In 1987, despite opposition and demonstrations, local Centre Party politician Sven-Olle Olsson (1929–2005), who was Sjöbo's municipal commissioner at the time, was successful in gaining the support of the Sjöbo municipal assembly to hold a referendum to decide if Sjöbo should ban the acceptance of foreign refugees. The controversial referendum passed with a 67.4% majority for the ban in 1988, gaining Olsson and Sjöbo much publicity in the Swedish media. The outcome was heavily criticized by Swedish media and politicians (including then-Prime Minister Ingvar Carlsson).

Olsson was in turn expelled from the Centre Party following the referendum which led to the forming of the nationalist Sjöbo Party (Swedish: Sjöbopartiet) in March 1991. In the municipal elections the same year, the party received 31% of the votes. This led to Olsson once again becoming municipal commissioner, a position he held until 1998, when his party's support was reduced to 15% in the municipal elections. Following the Sjöbo party's loss of support, the ban was overturned by Sjöbo's municipal assembly, and Sjöbo accepted its first refugees in more than a decade in 2001.

== Background and motion ==
In 1977, while a member of the Centre Party, Sven-Olle Olsson, a former farmer, was elected as Sjöbo's Municipal commissioner. The Centre Party in Sjöbo, led by Olsson, submitted a motion to Sjöbo's municipal assembly in June 1987 for a referendum on the acceptance of foreign refugees in the municipality. The motion came after a proposal that fifteen refugees be accepted into the municipality, an idea Olsson disliked. It has been speculated that the reason behind the motion was not these fifteen refugees, a small number for the municipality, but, instead, Olsson's idea to create a protest against Sweden's positive stance on refugees. Despite heavy protests from most of the country, Sjöbo's municipal assembly decided in October 1987 to go through with the referendum in 1988. If the referendum passed, it would completely ban Sjöbo from accepting foreign refugees.

== Referendum ==
=== Debate and media attention ===
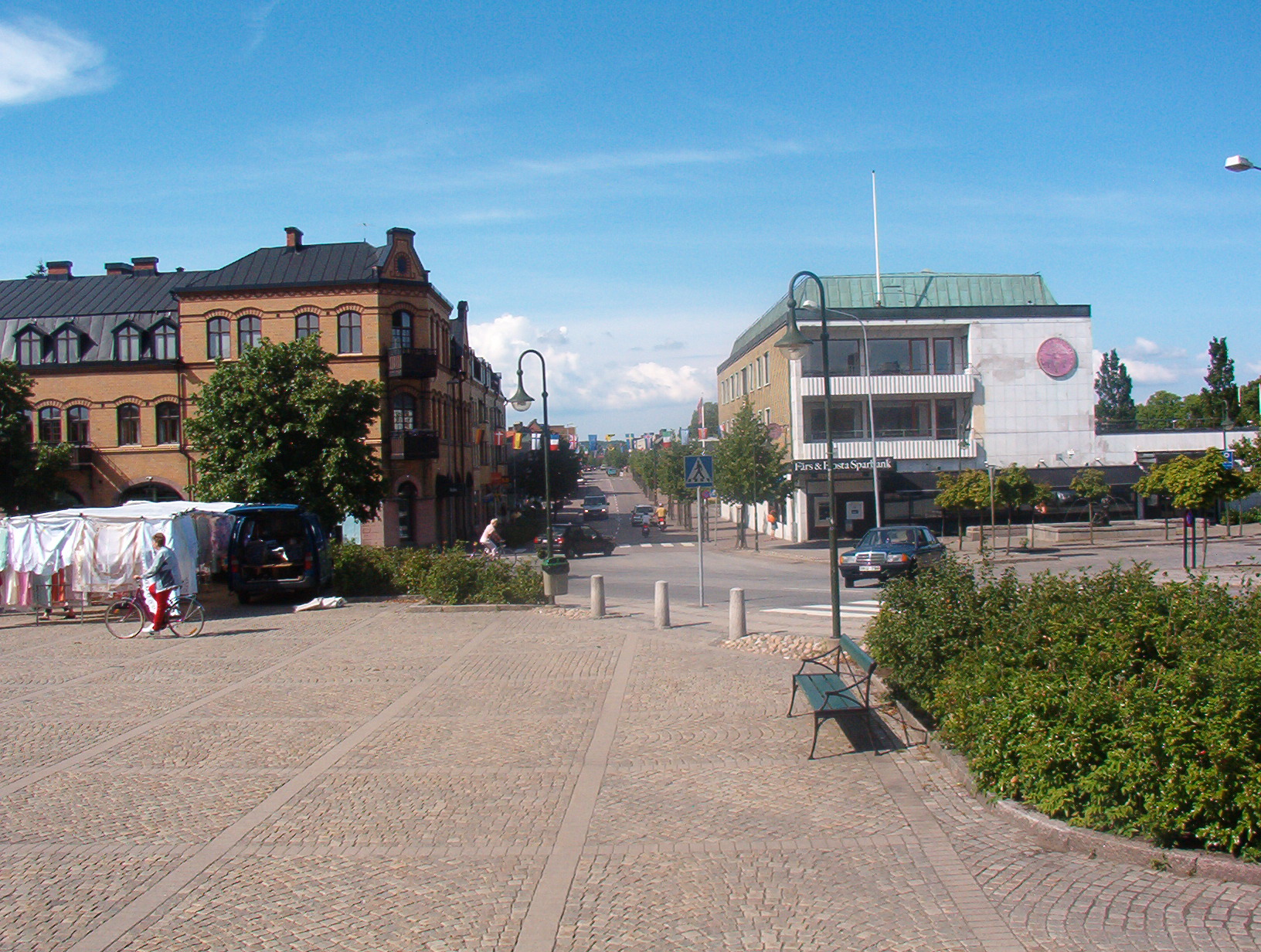
A part of Sjöbo's town square, where both pro- and anti- demonstrations were held

The municipality's decision to go through with the referendum was met with even more criticism from the rest of the country. Immigration minister and Social Democrat Georg Andersson described the vote as a "macabre expression of egoism, and a violation of the refugees' human dignity." A majority of the population in Sjöbo, however, was in favor of the referendum. One citizen stated that "Foreigners just create problems. It's only democratic to vote about this. I'm all for it."

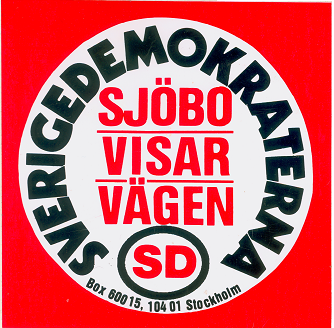
The Sweden Democrats saw Sjöbo as an inspiration.

It was, however, reported, that several of those who were in favor of accepting refugees, were afraid of expressing their opinion in public. On the day of the vote, 18 September 1988, the Associated Press reported that the refugee issue had split families, friends, and even the town's only church."

The referendum and the protests against it also drew attention abroad. On 12 September 1988, The Philadelphia Inquirer wrote: "A referendum on accepting refugees in this quiet Swedish town has flared into an ugly battle watched closely by a country that prides itself on its tolerant attitudes and absence of racism."

Madeleine Ramel, a baroness, and the head of the local Social Welfare Board that was planning on taking care of the refugees, said: "a lot of people are very ashamed. It's terrible. The town has changed." Ramel was Olsson's strongest opposition in Sjöbo at the time. The Baroness became a symbol of the minority who supported the acceptance of refugees into the municipality. According to the local newspaper Skånska Dagbladet, "the Swedish media, especially the evening newspapers, loved the polarization between the simple farmer who did not want foreigners in the village and the baroness who wanted to take in the needy with open arms."

Olsson's main argument in the debate leading up to the day of the referendum was that foreigners would not be able to fit into a community such as Sjöbo. He repeatedly stated that these people come from "unknown cultures" and that it would be impossible for them to integrate into the Swedish society. Per-Ingvar Magnusson, the then-chairman of the Sjöbo branch of the Center Party, stated to the media that the referendum had nothing to do with racism; he claimed that the reason for the vote was that Sjöbo lacked housing and jobs. He said in an interview that he was surprised by the attention the town had received in the media: "They make us out to be stupid, fools, farmers who live in isolation. The town simply wants to take care of its own first."

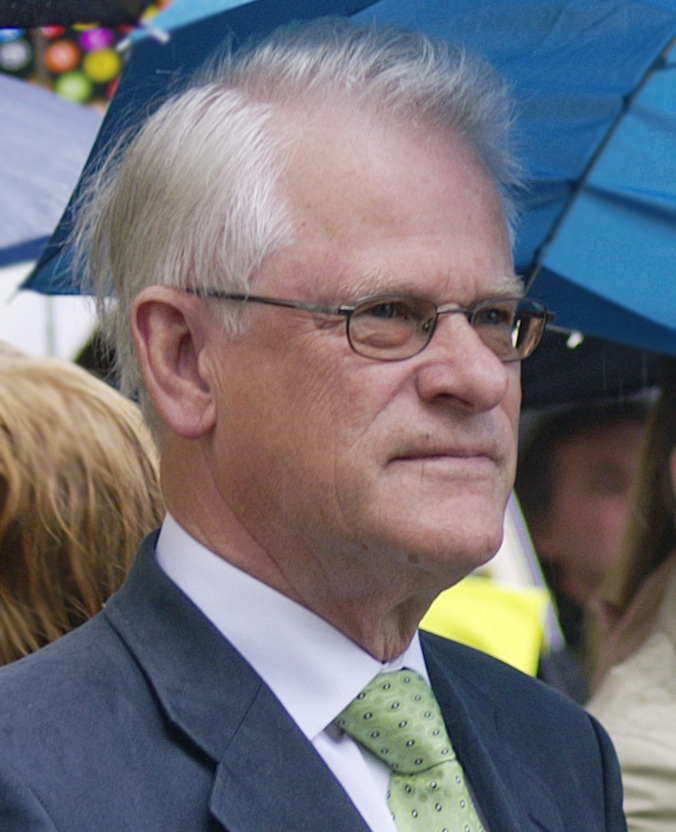
Then-Prime Minister Ingvar Carlsson was critical of the ban.

=== Result ===
The referendum was held in Sjöbo on 18 September 1988, the day of the Swedish general election, and passed with a 67 percent majority of the votes (6,237 for and 3,000 against), which led to even more criticism from the Swedish population. Then-Prime Minister of Sweden Ingvar Carlsson said the results were "tragic", and the then-leader of the Centre Party, Olof Johansson, called the ban "improper". The result of the referendum led to concerns from the Swedish government that other municipalities would follow in Sjöbo's footsteps. The day after the vote, Madeleine Ramel commented: "This is a sad result. Everyone is a loser. It is unfortunate for Sjöbo."

Heléne Lööw, a Swedish historian, stated that one of the likely reasons for the relatively large xenophobia in Skåne County at the time was the high unemployment numbers. The county had accepted a large number of refugees compared to the rest of Sweden, and many saw this as the reason for the lack of jobs. Lööw also stated that the xenophobia could have been strengthened by local traditions. Nazi groups were "relatively strong" in Skåne in the 1930s.

== Aftermath ==
The ban was heavily discussed in the Swedish media. Following the criticism, and after claims that Olsson was associated with the New Swedish Movement, the Centre Party decided in 1988 to exclude Olsson and his companions Börje Ohlsson and Per-Ivar Magnusson from the party. They responded by forming the nationalist Sjöbo Party (Sjöbopartiet) in March 1991. In the municipal elections the same year, the party received 31 percent of the votes. This led to Olsson once again becoming Municipal Commissioner, a position he held until 1998, when the party's support was reduced to 15% in the municipal elections. Following Sjöbo party's loss of support, the referendum was overturned by Sjöbo's municipal assembly, and Sjöbo accepted its first refugees since more than a decade in 2001. Although Olsson died in 2005, the party is still active, and in the 2010 municipal election the party received 11.4% of the votes, making it the third largest party in Sjöbo. In 2014 the nationwide anti-immigration party Sweden Democrats became the largest party in parliament elections in Sjöbo Municipality with a 29.96% share of the vote. Sjöbo was the only one of 290 municipalities where that happened and the first time the Sweden Democrats had topped a municipality in its history.

== See also ==
- Immigration to Sweden
- Sweden Democrats
