= Brönnestad Church =

15th century church in Brönnestad, Sweden

- Brönnestads kyrka
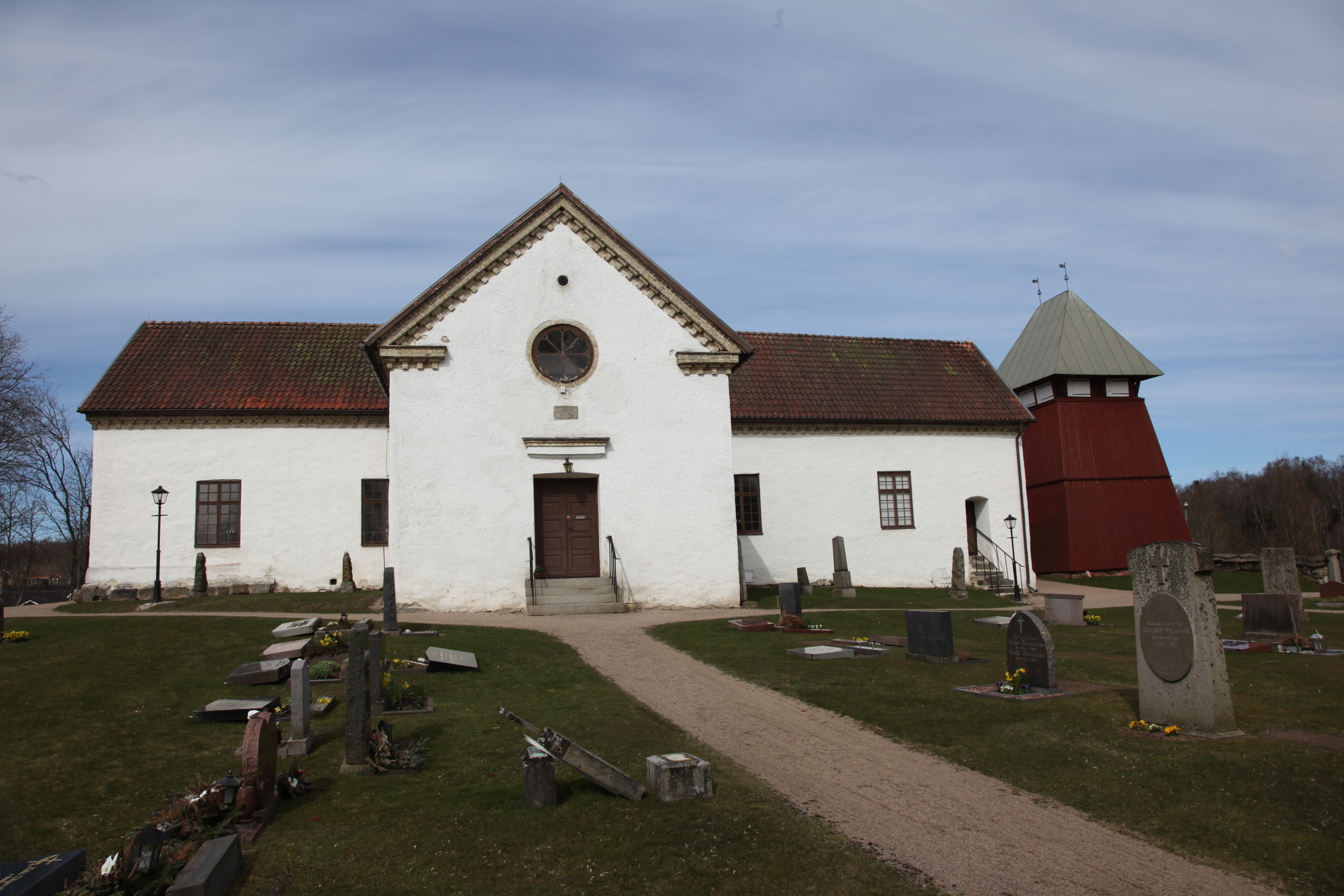
- Brönnestad Church

- 56°04′48″N 13°41′53″E
- Country: Sweden
- Denomination: Church of Sweden

Brönnestad Church (Swedish: Brönnestads kyrka) is a church in Brönnestad, a village in Hässleholm Municipality, Sweden. The church was built in the 12th century and has been successively enlarged in the following centuries. In the 15th century, the interior was decorated with murals, stylistically and iconographically unusual for a Swedish context. They were rediscovered under layers of whitewash and restored during the 20th century.

== History and architecture ==
The oldest parts of the church, the nave and parts of the chancel, date from the third quarter of the 12th century. The church has been rebuilt and expanded several times. During the 15th century a church porch was added to the south, but replaced by a larger transept in 1871. The church was also enlarged to the west during the 15th century, towards the north in the 1690s and to the east in 1734. The vaults of the church date from the 15th century. A major restoration was carried out between 1935 and 1936, and again between 1980 and 1981, when the medieval murals in the church were uncovered and restored.

The external wooden belfry of the church was built between 1491 and 1492, and is one of only nine such belfries in Scania. The church never had a tower.

Among the furnishings, the baptismal font is the oldest, dating from the construction period of the church. The rood cross is from the 15th century, and similar in style to rood crosses from Farstorp, Nymö and Stiby churches. Both the altarpiece and the pulpit date from the second half of the 18th century and were made by Johan Ullberg. There are also some memorial plaques commemorating members of the Ehrenborg family, the former owners of nearby Hovdala Castle. The pulpit also displays the family's coat of arms.

== Murals ==
The two vaults of the nave and the vault of the chancel are all decorated with murals from the 15th century. At some point, possibly during the 18th century, they were covered with a layer of whitewash and their existence eventually forgotten. In 1935, they were discovered again, but mainly due to a lack of funds no work to uncover and restore them was made until 1980. In that year Våga Andersson-Lindell, who had led the work of restoring the murals in Vä Church, began to uncover and carefully restore the murals. The work was finished in 1981.

The overall composition of the murals is typical for Nordic church murals from the late Middle Ages. They depict scenes from the Bible, religious legends, individual figures representing saints, and also purely ornamental subjects. The murals are comparatively well-preserved. The murals have been dated to the second half of the 1440s on stylistic grounds. They are stylistically and iconographically related to murals in Västra Sallerup Church, but otherwise the murals are unparalleled within the province. In comparison with the murals in Västra Sallerup Church, the ones in Brönnestad have a broader iconographic range. They are in a late International Gothic style, showing traits of an emerging realism.

The murals in the chancel depict single saints with their attributes, depicted together in pairs. The saints depicted include ancient Christian martyrs such as Saint Catherine and Saint Dorothy, but also typically Nordic saints such as Saint Olaf and Saint Bridget. The easternmost section of the chancel vault, which would have been immediately above the altar during the Middle Ages, shows Saint Mary with the infant Christ and flanked by two musicians, at least one of which appears to be an angel.

The murals adorning the two vaults in the nave are in contrast to the ones in the chancel narrative, depicting identifiable scenes mostly from the life of Christ, but also two legends about the life of Christ not found in the Bible. In total there are eight major narrative scenes in the two vaults of the nave, and several smaller paintings. The two non-Biblical legends are an extra-biblical legend about the Flight into Egypt and a story from the Syriac Infancy Gospel. They are highly unusual as subject matters in Swedish art history, and the iconography of some of the more common subjects also differs from the way they were ordinarily represented.

Overview of the murals

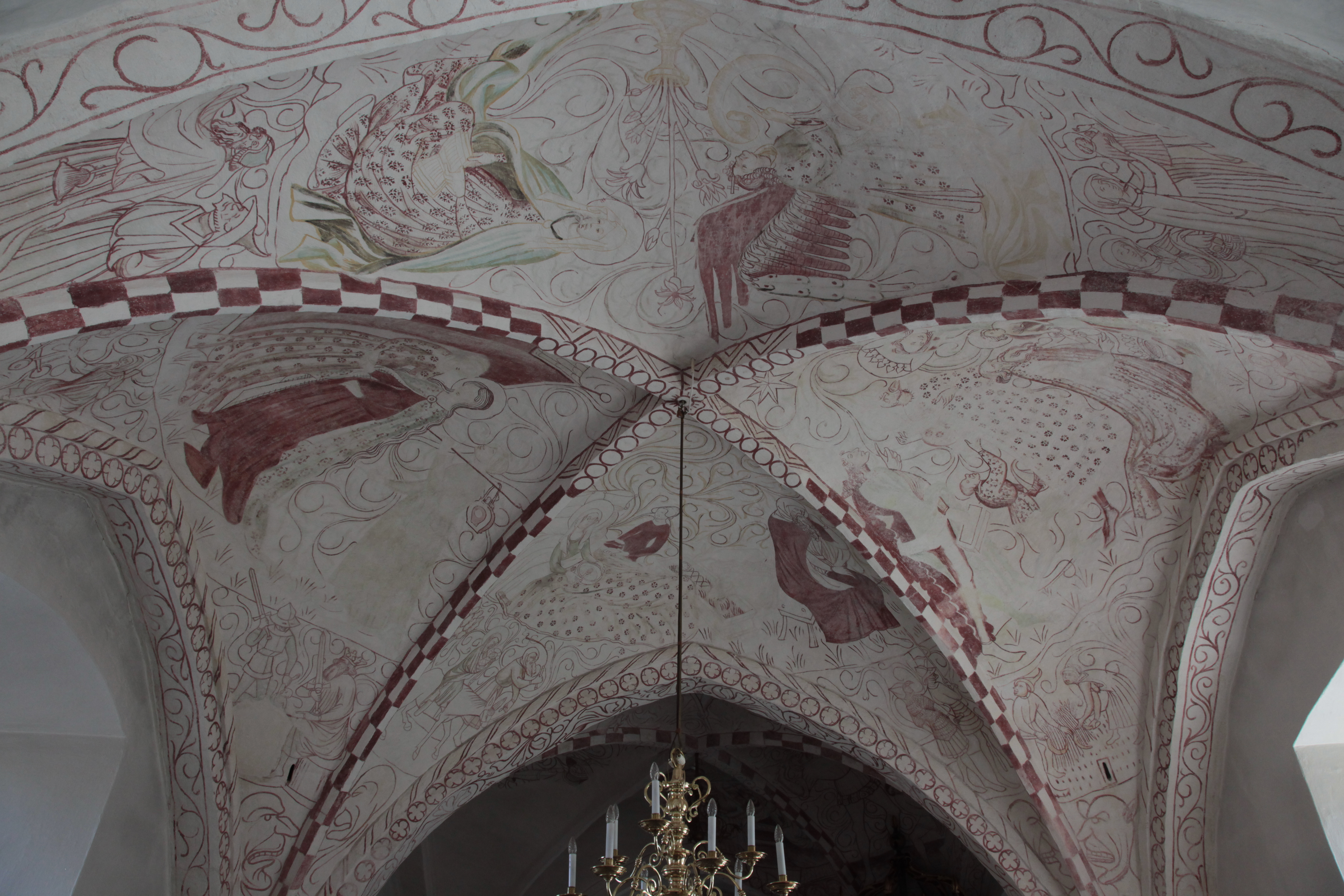
The west vault of the nave

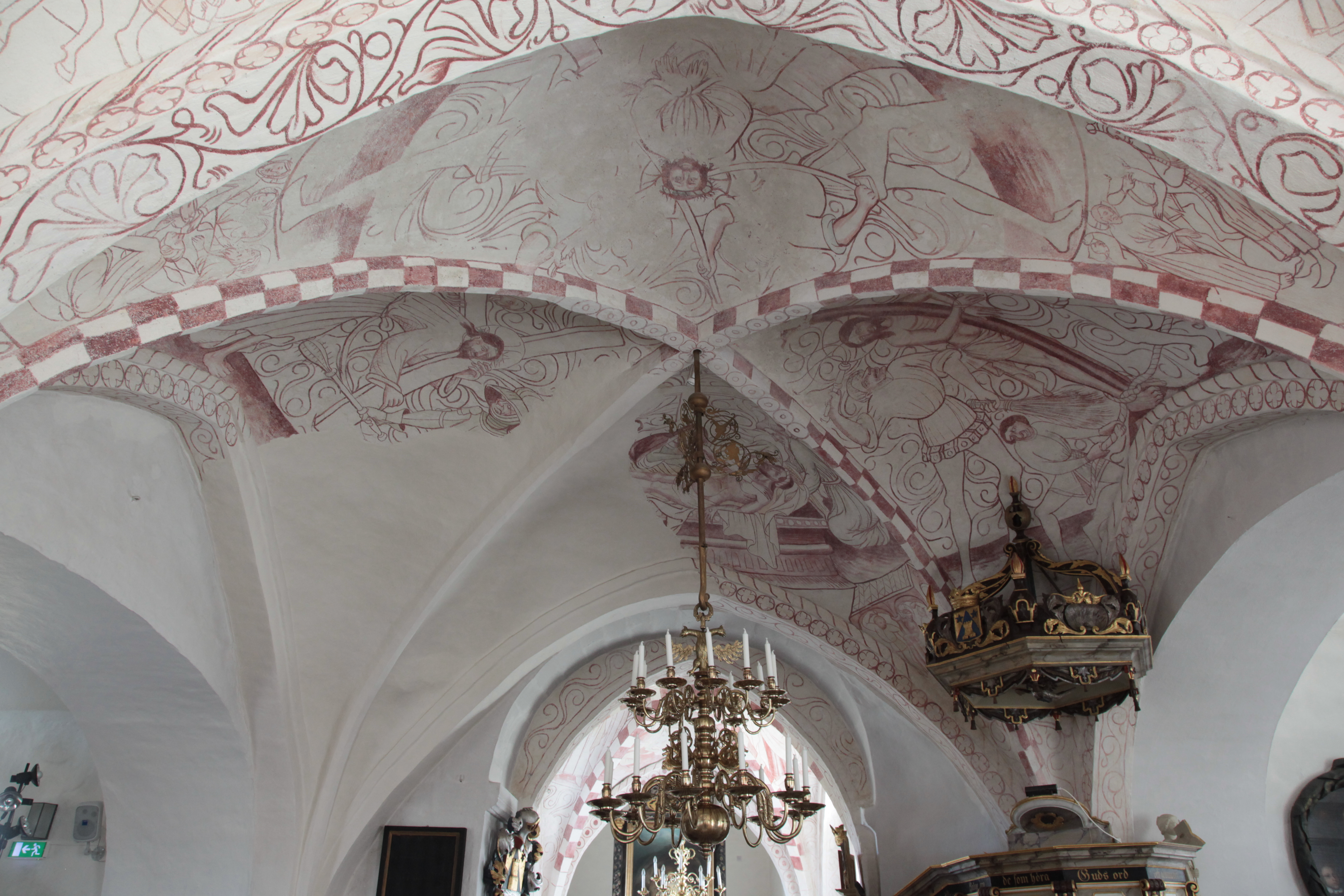
The east vault of the nave

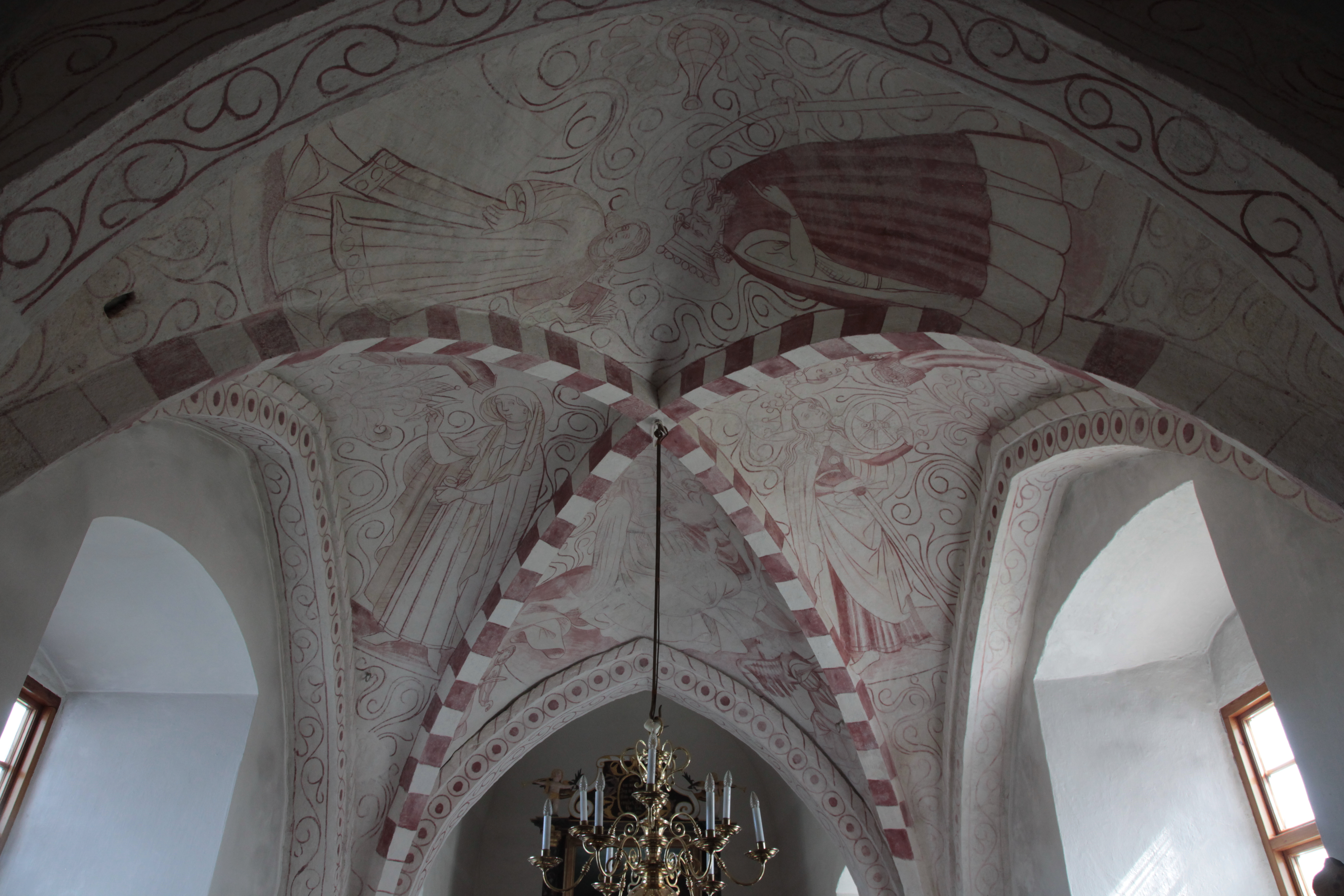
The chancel vault

== Works cited ==
- Eriksson, Torkel (1982). "Nyframtagna medeltidsmålningar i Brönnestad" [Recently uncovered medieval paintings in Brönnestad] (PDF). Ale. Historisk tidskrift för Skåneland (in Swedish) (2): 1–20.
- Dahlberg, Markus; Sjöström, Ingrid, eds. (2015). Skåne. Landskapets kyrkor [Scania. The churches of the province] (in Swedish). Stockholm: Riksantikvarieämbetet (Swedish National Heritage Board). ISBN 978-91-7209-710-0.
- Wahlöö, Claes (2014). Skånes kyrkor 1050-1949 [Scania's churches 1050–1949] (in Swedish). Kävlinge: Domus Propria. pp. 50–51. ISBN 978-91-637-5874-4.
