= Farstorp Church =

Medieval church in Skåne, Sweden

- Farstorps kyrka
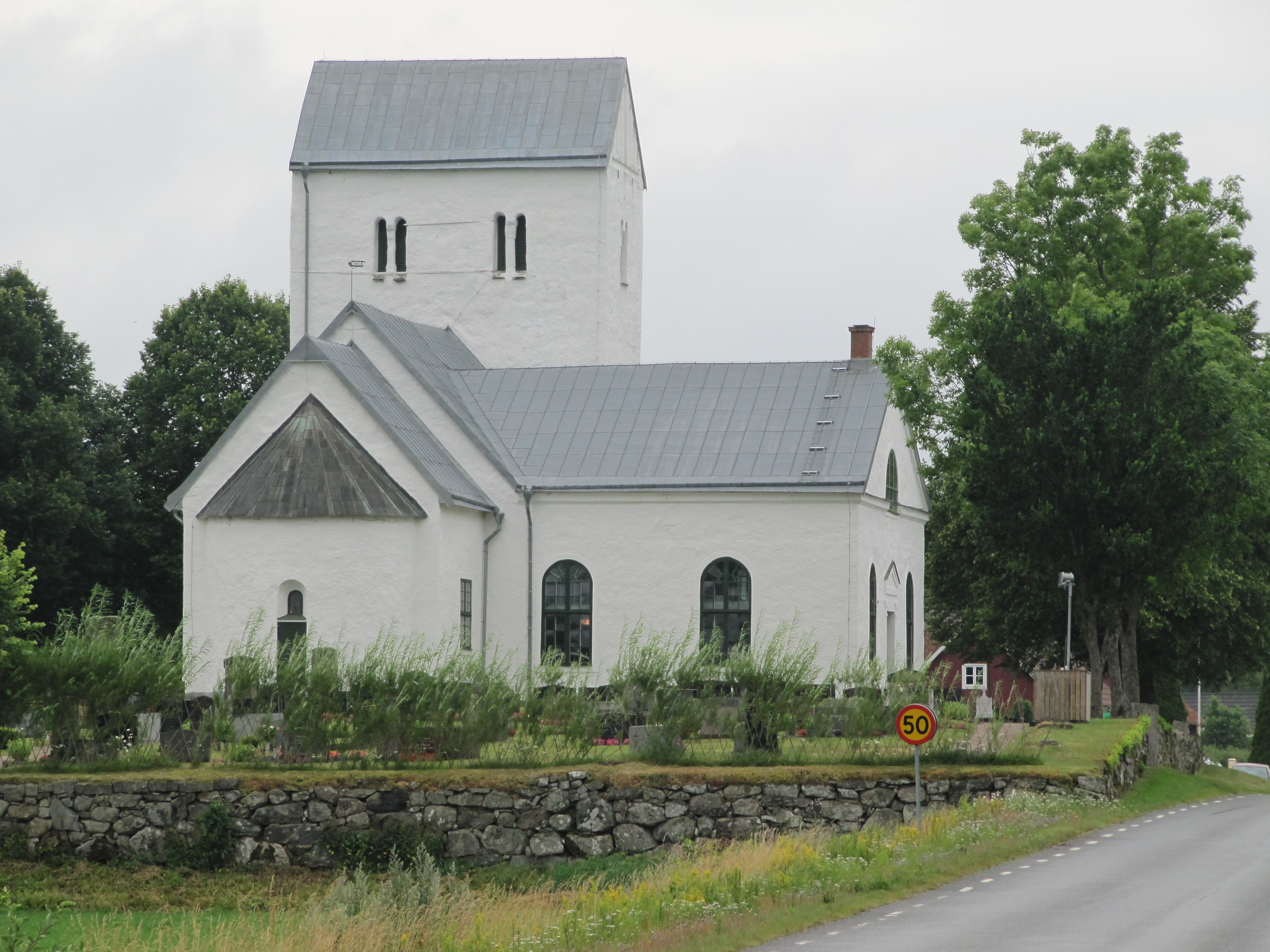
- Farstorp Church

- 56°16′37″N 13°47′48″E
- Country: Sweden
- Denomination: Church of Sweden

Farstorp Church (Swedish: Farstorps kyrka) is a medieval church in Farstorp, in the province of Skåne, Sweden. It belongs to the Diocese of Lund.

== History and architecture ==
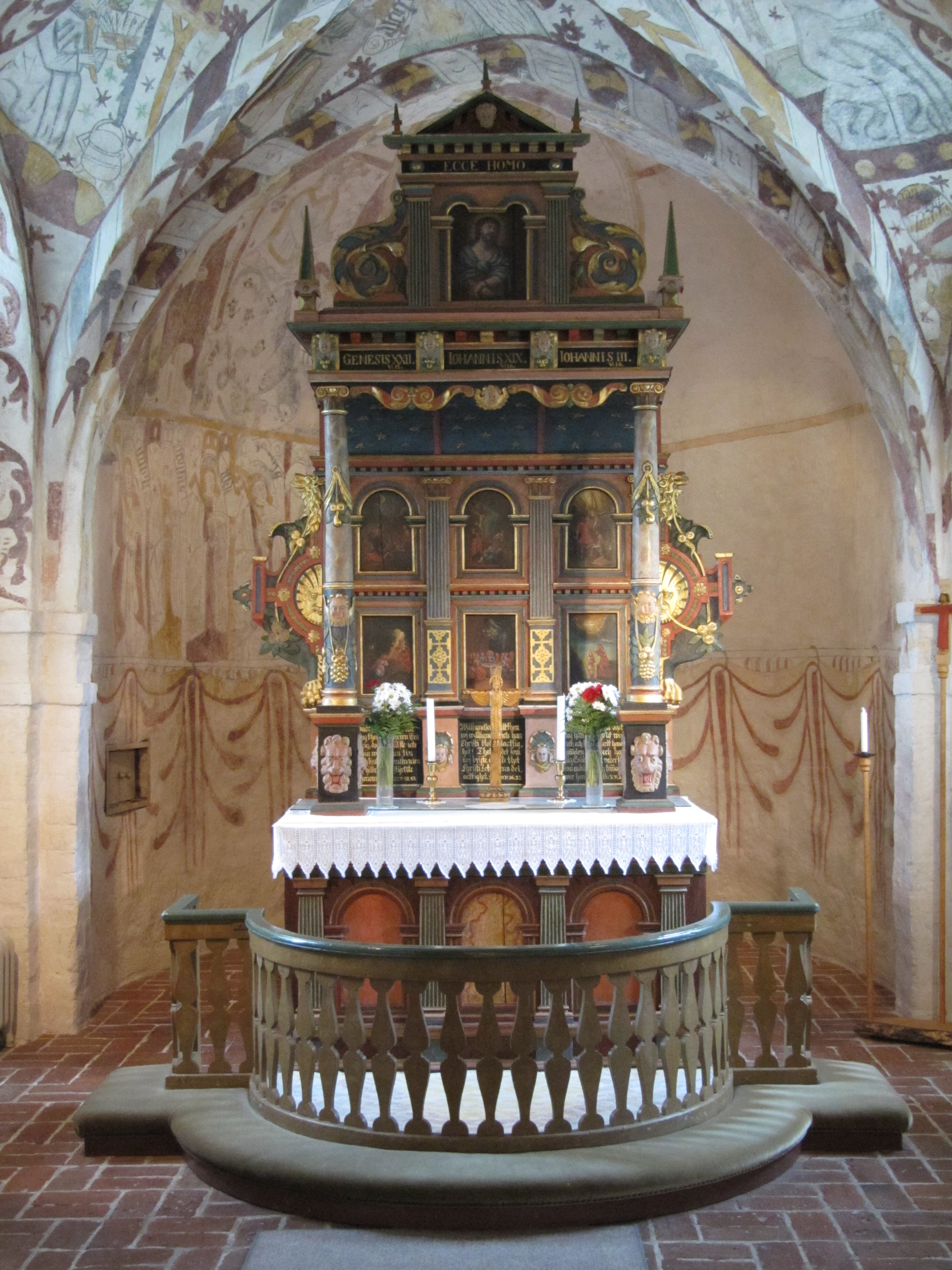
Interior view of the choir with murals and altarpiece

The first written sources to indicate a church in Farstorp are from 1241, but the presently visible church was built already during the second half of the 12th century. The broad western tower, nave, and apse are from this period. A church porch was added to the church sometime during the late Middle Ages but later destroyed. During the 15th century, the ceilings of the nave and choir were replaced with vaults; those of the nave were destroyed during a renovation in the 1830s and the present nave ceiling dates from 1941 to 1942. The northern transept was also built in the 1830s. In contrast, the ceiling in the apse is original, dating from the time of the construction of the church.

The operetta singer Sonja Stjernquist (1931–2002) is buried in the cemetery of the church.

== Murals ==
The choir of the church is profusely decorated with medieval murals. The apse wall displays Christ in Majesty surrounded by scenes from the Bible. On the wall separating the choir from the nave there are depictions of Saint Olaf and Saint Eric together with Christ crucified. The choir vault is decorated with a third set of murals dating from the end of the 15th century and made by the same artist who made the paintings in Everlöv Church. They depict scenes from the New Testament. Elsewhere in the church, fragments of paintings exist on the ground floor of the tower, including a possible depiction of Saint Catherine.

== Furnishings ==
A number of medieval wooden sculptures originally in Farstorp Church are today in the historical museum of Lund University, as well as an altar bell from 1586. The furnishings still in situ are all from after the Reformation. The lavish altarpiece was made at the end of the 16th century, possibly 1593, and was altered in 1733. The pulpit dates from 1593 and likewise altered in 1733, and again in 1921–23. The baptismal font from the 17th century was made locally. The present pews were made in 1732. The organ is from 1965 but uses the facade of the earlier organ, made in 1861.
