= Sjöbo Municipality =

Sjöbo Municipality Sjöbo kommun
- Municipality
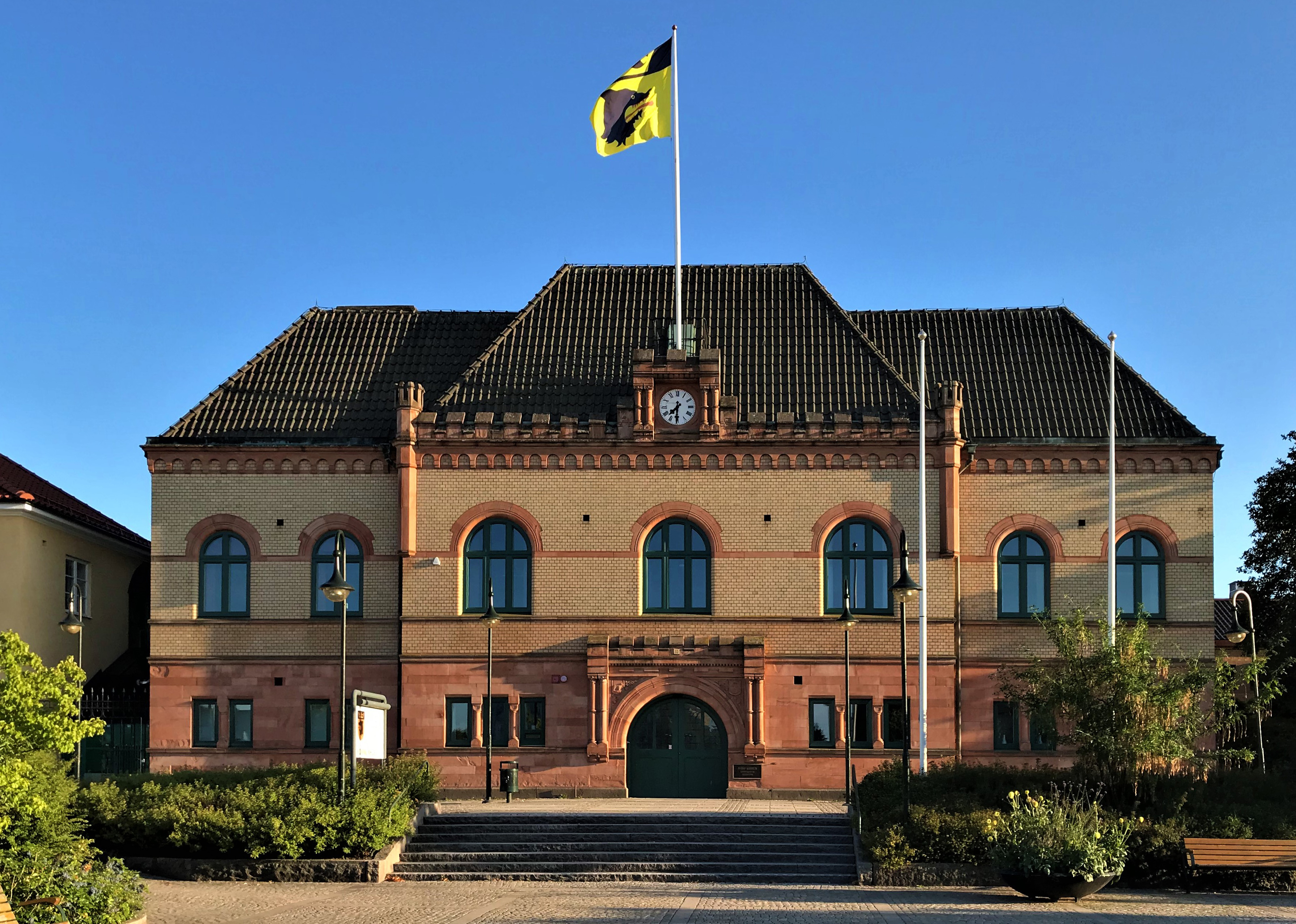
- Municipal Hall

- Coat of arms

- Coordinates: 55°38′00″N 13°42′00″E
- Country: Sweden
- County: Skåne County
- Seat: Sjöbo

Area
  - Total: 506.63 km^{2} (195.61 sq mi)
  - Land: 492.17 km^{2} (190.03 sq mi)
  - Water: 14.46 km^{2} (5.58 sq mi)
- Area as of 1 January 2014.

Population (30 June 2025)
  - Total: 19,323
  - Density: 39.261/km^{2} (101.69/sq mi)
- Time zone: UTC+1 (CET)
  - Summer (DST): UTC+2 (CEST)
- ISO 3166 code: SE
- Province: Scania
- Municipal code: 1265
- Website: www.sjobo.se

Sjöbo Municipality (Swedish: Sjöbo kommun) is a municipality in Skåne County in southern Sweden. Its seat is located in the town Sjöbo.

The present municipality was created in 1974 when the former market town (köping) Sjöbo was amalgamated with the surrounding rural municipalities. There are fifteen original entities within today's municipality.

== Geography ==
The town of Sjöbo has flat terrain, with many small houses and three long straight streets stretching through it, leading to larger roads.

The northwestern part of the municipality includes the main part of Vombsjön, the largest lake of southern Scania and notable for being the water source of Malmö. Some parts of the lake belong to Lund Municipality. It offers fishing for European perch, pike, pikeperch and eel.

=== Localities ===
There are 9 urban areas (also called a Tätort or locality) in Sjöbo Municipality.

In the table they are listed according to the size of the population as of December 31, 2005. The municipal seat is in bold characters.

#	Locality	Population
1	**Sjöbo**	6,364
2	Blentarp	1,144
3	Vollsjö	788
4	Lövestad	608
4	Sjöbo sommarby och Svansjö sommarby	608
6	Karups sommarby	316
7	Bjärsjölagård	311
8	Sövde	301
9	Äsperöd	226

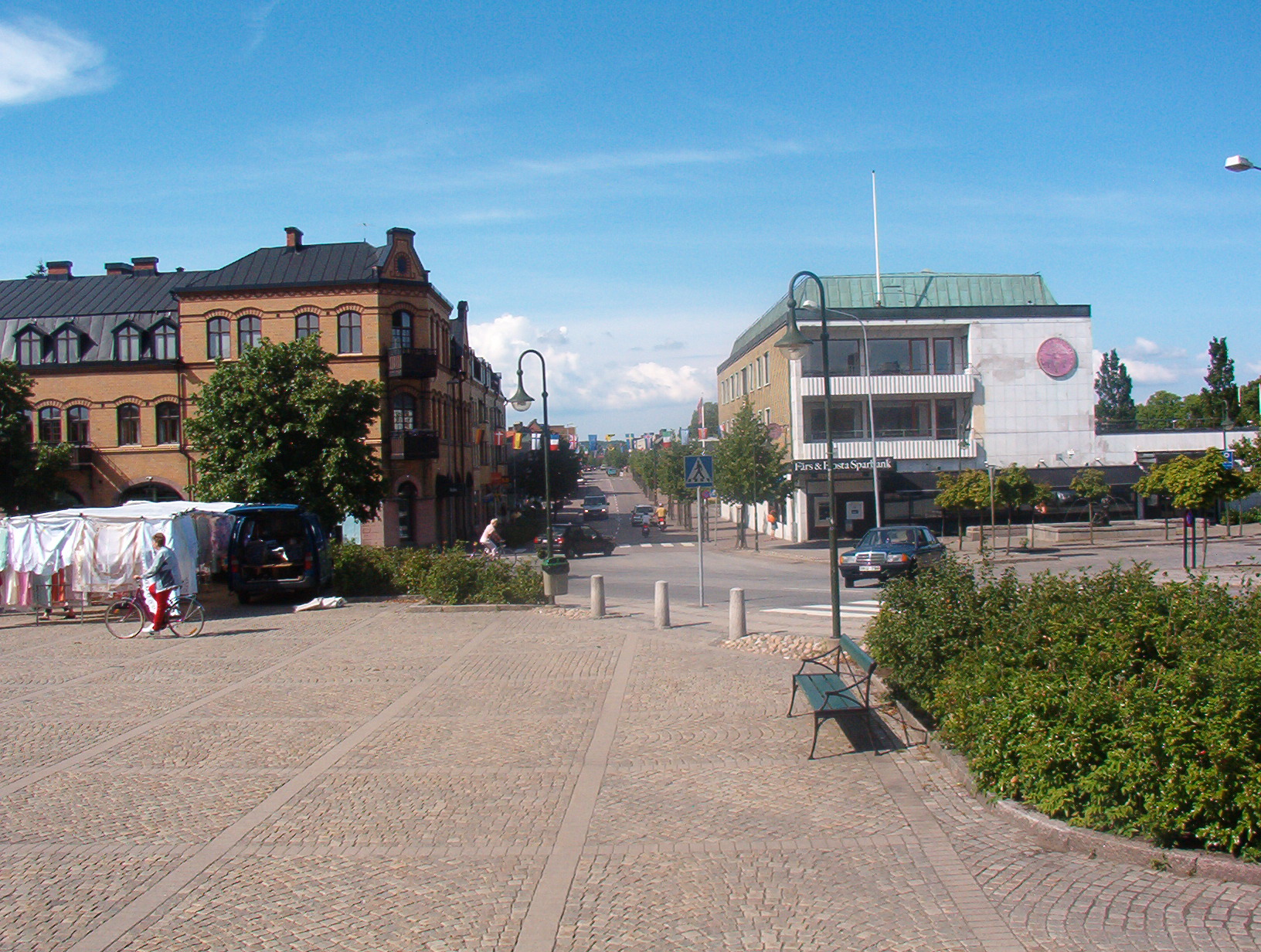
Main village square

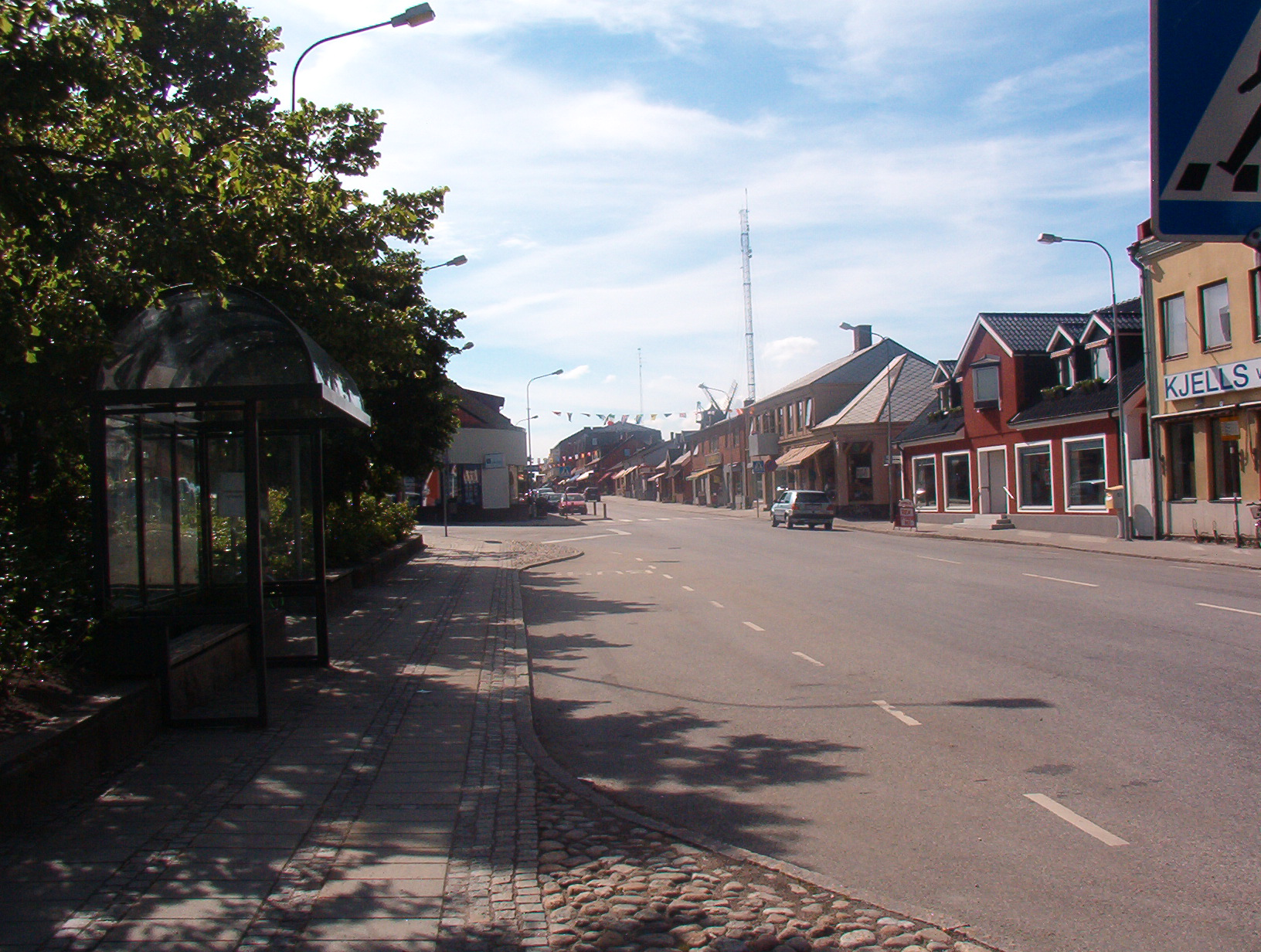
The main streets are long and straight in Sjöbo

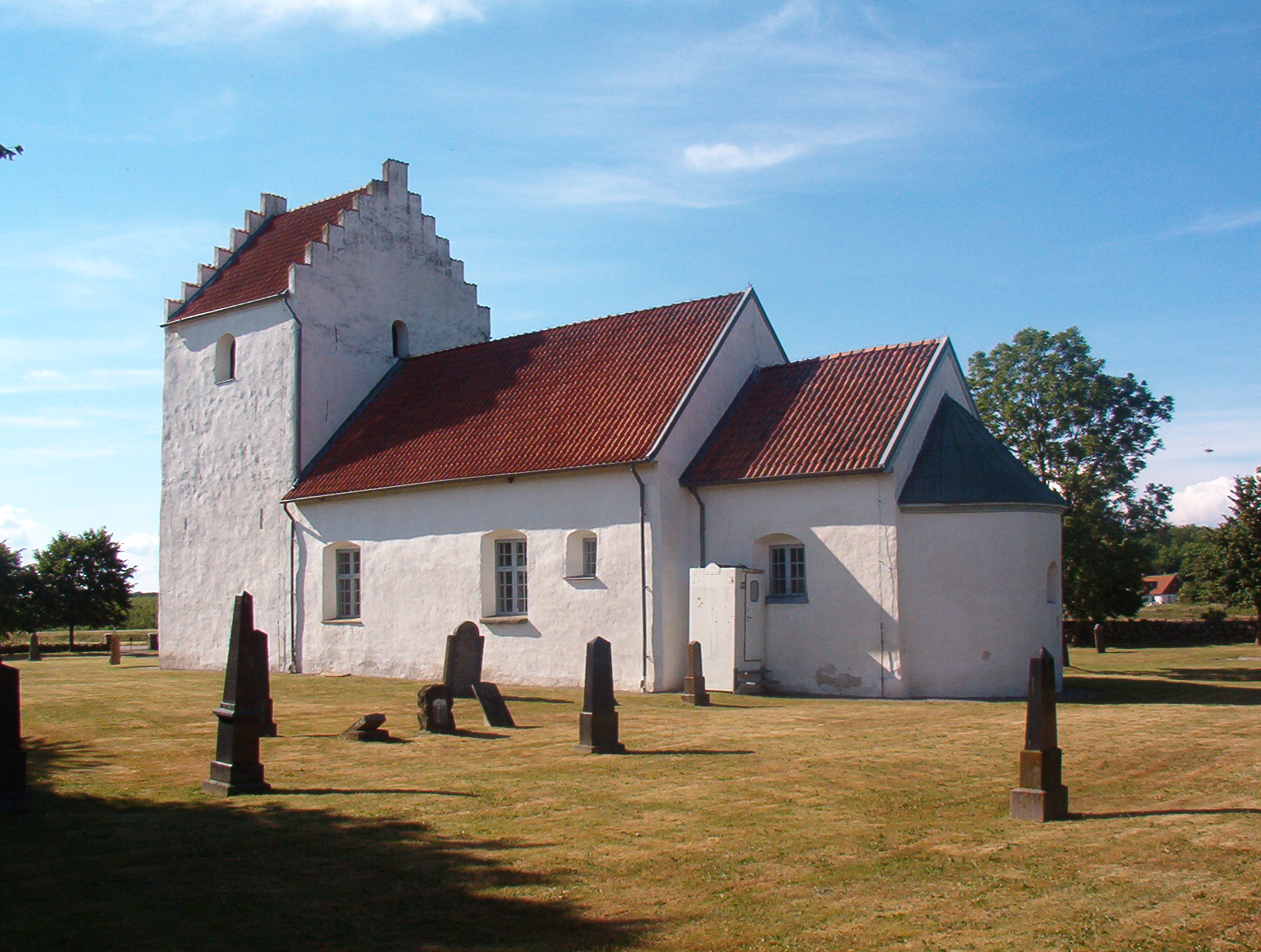
The Old Church of Södra Åsum, just north of Sjöbo

== Activities ==
There are at least five (largely) authentic medieval churches from the 12th century in the municipality (in Södra Åsum, Tolånga, Björka, Blentarp and Everlöv). They are notable for not having undergone the severe restorations that many other churches in Scania suffered once the population began growing in the second half of the 19th century and Helgo Zetterwall was hired to expand on them.

Frescos which adorned the apse of Södra Åsum church and the ceilings of the churches in Everlöv and Illstrop centuries ago have been slowly uncovered in recent years. Many similar churches had their ornamentation stripped and their paintings plastered over as part of the iconoclasm of Sweden's adoption of Lutheranism.

Apart from religious activities, there is the annual festival Sjöbo marknad, which translates to English as Sjöbo fair. It was first held in 1864, and is now held in late July, attracting some 100,000 visitors, making it one of the largest country fairs in Sweden. It has carousels and is otherwise noted for its pottery vendors and trade.

== Refugee controversy ==
Sjöbo Municipality reached the public eye in Sweden in 1988 when, under the leadership of the Municipal Commissioner Sven-Olle Olsson, it voted by a majority of 67% in a referendum that it would not accept foreign asylum seekers. Most other municipalities in Sweden accepted refugees that came from troubled countries such as former Yugoslavia and Iraq.

== Demographics ==
This is a demographic table based on Sjöbo Municipality's electoral districts in the 2022 Swedish general election sourced from SVT's election platform, in turn taken from SCB official statistics.

In total there were 19,473 inhabitants, including 14,943 Swedish citizens of voting age. 28.8% voted for the left coalition and 70.1% for the right coalition. With 42.6 % of the vote, Sjöbo saw the highest result in the entire country for the Sweden Democrats. Indicators are in percentage points except population totals and income.

Location	Residents	Citizen adults	Left vote	Right vote	Employed	Swedish parents	Foreign heritage	Income SEK	Degree
Location			%	%					
Blentarp	2,262	1,728	28.8	70.4	84	87	13	27,005	40
Everlöv	1,032	847	31.5	66.3	85	89	11	27,202	35
Fränninge	937	696	25.0	73.8	84	87	13	24,015	27
Lövestad	1,303	1,008	29.0	68.6	80	84	16	22,310	27
Sjöbo C	1,507	1,166	36.8	62.5	72	81	19	19,070	24
Sjöbo Emanuel	1,768	1,337	28.8	70.6	83	88	12	25,484	27
Sjöbo Färsinga	1,907	1,430	30.2	68.9	81	86	14	23,696	32
Sjöbo Linné	2,168	1,617	22.8	76.6	85	89	11	25,393	27
Sjöbo Sandbäck	1,693	1,382	27.0	71.5	84	92	8	25,483	26
Sövde	671	560	35.4	63.6	82	89	11	27,169	42
Vanstad	1,694	1,316	25.5	72.9	83	88	12	24,019	31
Vollsjö	1,496	1,119	25.1	73.7	78	83	17	22,941	27
Östra Kärrstorp	1,035	737	33.8	66.0	76	83	17	24,388	32
Source: SVT

== Elections ==
These are the results of elections held since the 1972 municipal reform. In 2014 Sjöbo Municipality became the first municipality in Sweden where the Sweden Democrats held the largest share of the votes. The high number of "missing" votes from the list from 1991 belonged to the Sjöbo Party. The Sweden Democrats numbers in 1988-1998 were not listed at a municipal level by the SCB due to the party's small size domestically.

=== Riksdag ===
Year	Turnout	Votes	V	S	MP	C	L	KD	M	SD	ND
1973	90.1	8,924	0.8	32.4	0.0	47.4	7.7	0.5	11.1	0.0	0.0
1976	91.5	9,714	0.9	31.2	0.0	44.2	9.0	0.6	14.0	0.0	0.0
1979	90.6	9,978	1.4	32.4	0.0	36.6	8.9	0.3	20.1	0.0	0.0
1982	90.4	10,165	1.3	34.9	1.7	32.6	5.6	0.3	23.5	0.0	0.0
1985	87.5	9,995	1.2	35.5	1.6	27.7	10.7	0.0	23.2	0.0	0.0
1988	88.1	10,070	1.7	36.6	5.5	26.0	7.2	0.8	21.3	0.0	0.0
1991	85.1	10,259	1.3	28.0	2.5	6.9	4.1	4.5	19.8	0.0	6.3
1994	84.4	10,357	2.3	39.1	3.3	14.1	3.0	2.0	24.4	0.0	1.7
1998	77.2	9,438	6.7	33.8	3.0	10.0	3.1	10.8	27.2	0.0	0.0
2002	75.7	9,561	4.7	36.6	2.7	10.7	9.0	9.2	18.4	5.0	0.0
2006	77.7	10,199	3.0	32.2	2.7	10.5	5.2	5.9	29.6	8.9	0.0
2010	81.5	11,189	2.9	23.5	4.1	8.6	4.9	3.9	35.0	15.8	0.0
2014	84.2	11,830	2.4	23.7	3.9	7.7	2.9	3.4	23.2	30.0	0.0
2018	86.6	12,418	3.3	19.1	2.4	7.1	2.9	6.2	18.2	39.2	0.0

Blocs

This lists the relative strength of the socialist and centre-right blocs since 1973, but parties not elected to the Riksdag are inserted as "other", including the Sweden Democrats results from 1988 to 2006, but also the Christian Democrats pre-1991 and the Greens in 1982, 1985 and 1991. The sources are identical to the table above. The coalition or government mandate marked in bold formed the government after the election. New Democracy got elected in 1991 but are still listed as "other" due to the short lifespan of the party.

Year	Turnout	Votes	Left	Right	SD	Other	Elected
1973	90.1	8,924	**33.2**	66.2	0.0	0.6	99.4
1976	91.5	9,714	32.1	**67.2**	0.0	0.7	99.3
1979	90.6	9,978	33.8	**65.6**	0.0	0.6	99.4
1982	90.4	10,165	**36.2**	61.7	0.0	2.1	97.9
1985	87.5	9,995	**36.7**	61.6	0.0	1.7	98.3
1988	88.1	10,070	**43.8**	54.5	0.0	1.7	98.3
1991	85.1	10,259	29.3	**35.3**	0.0	35.4	70.9
1994	84.4	10,357	**44.7**	43.5	0.0	11.8	88.2
1998	77.2	9,438	**43.5**	51.1	0.0	5.4	94.6
2002	75.7	9,561	**44.0**	47.3	0.0	8.7	91.3
2006	77.7	10,199	37.9	**51.2**	0.0	10.9	89.1
2010	81.5	11,189	30.5	**52.4**	15.8	1.3	98.7
2014	84.2	11,830	**30.0**	37.2	30.0	2.8	97.2
