= Henriksdal Spring Tour =

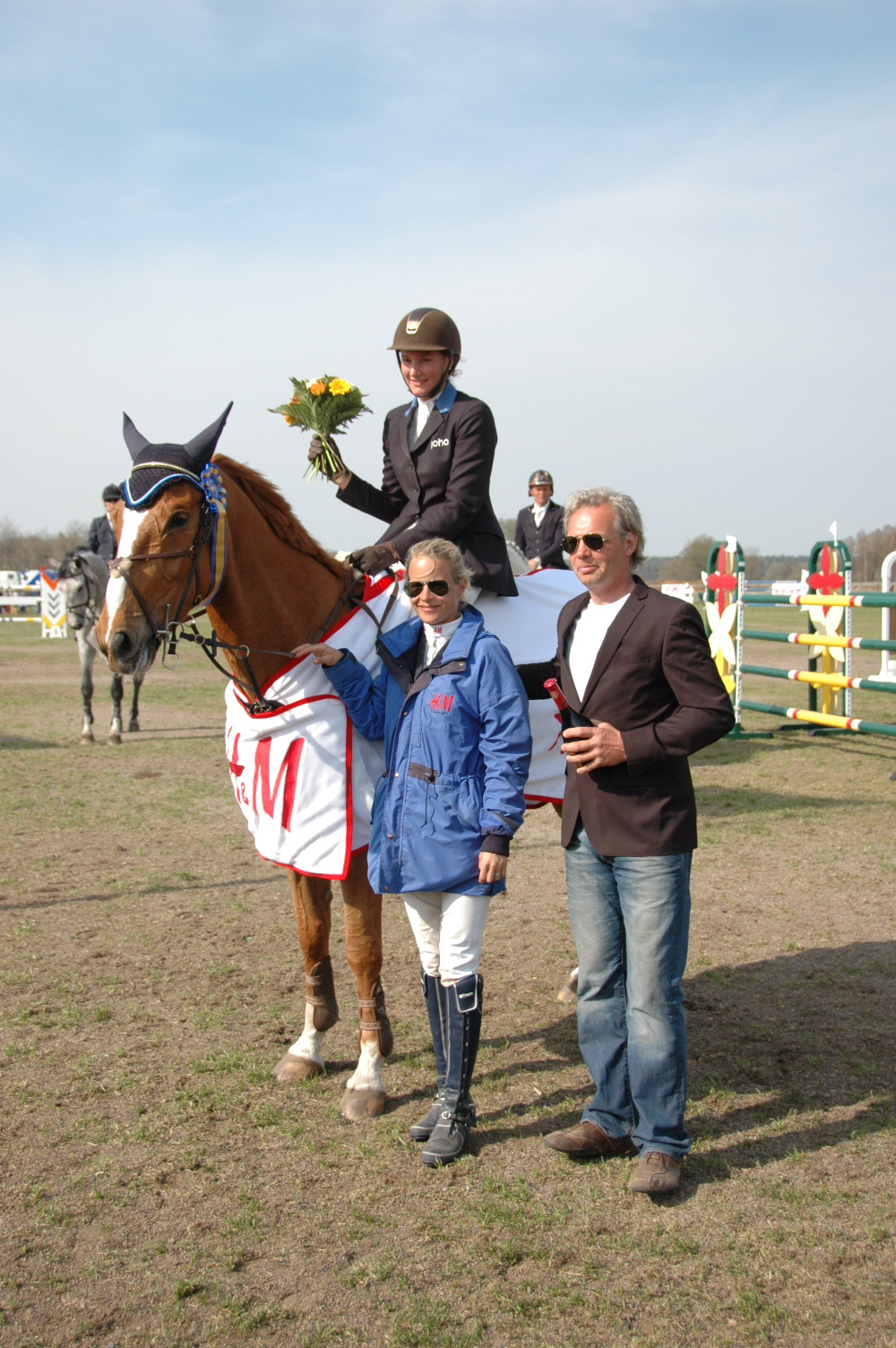
Malin Baryard and Ragnar Bengtsson hand over the prize to the winner of Henriksdal Spring Tour's Grand Prix 2009, Norwegian Cecilie Hatteland.

Henriksdal Spring Tour is a new and independent elite horse show arranged over two weekends at Henriksdal's estate in Blentarp, Skåne in Sweden. The first competition took place the 16 to 18 April, followed by the 23–26 April 2009. Parts of the Nordic showjumping elite participated, amongst others Malin Baryard, Maria Gretzer, Peder Fredricson and Jens Fredricson, Piia Pantsu, Linnea Ericsson together with top horses and riders from several other countries. In 2009 there were a total of over 2000 starts on two grass courts with simultaneous events. The competition qualifies to the Falsterbo Horse Show.

The total prize money was somewhere between SEK 250 000 and 300 000. In 2010 the event will take place twice in April and in August.

== Results - Grand Prix 1.45m - 26 April 2009. ==
Fifty-one riders competed in the 25,000 SEK Grand Prix. The jumping height was 1.45 meter for the Table A event. The top six riders placed and received prizes.

	Rider	Horse	Penalties	Time
1	(Norway) Cecilie Hatteland	Candy Floss	0	75.82
2	(Finland) Piia Pantsu	Chauvinist Z	0	75.88
3	(Denmark) Lars Pedersen	Cinderella	0	73.62
4	(Denmark) Linnea Ericsson	PGL Cronus	4	77.46
5	(Sweden) Maria Gretzer	Hip Hop 1045	4	73.62
6	(Sweden) Linda Heed	Bee Wonderful	4	73.62
