= Farstorp =

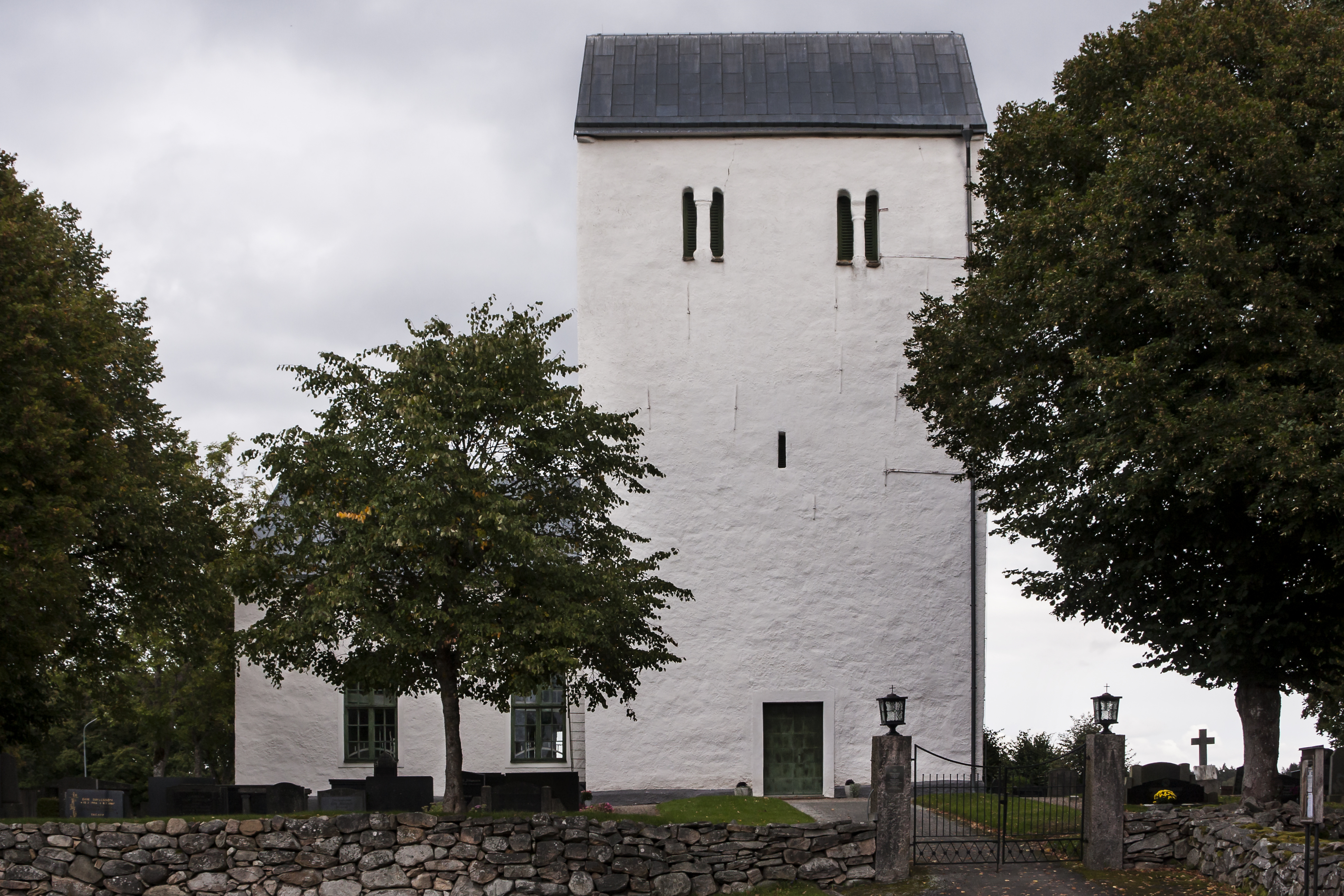
- Farstorp Church

- Location within Skåne Location within Sweden
- Coordinates: 56°16′39″N 13°47′41″E
- Country: Sweden
- Province: Skåne
- County: Skåne County
- Municipality: Hässleholm Municipality

Population
  - Total: 704
- Time zone: UTC+1 (CET)
  - Summer (DST): CEST

Farstorp is a locality village situated in Hässleholm Municipality, Skåne County, Sweden with 704 inhabitants in 2012.

The well-preserved medieval Farstorp Church lies in the village.
