= Sjöbo sommarby och Svansjö sommarby =

- Location within Skåne Location within Sweden
- Coordinates: 55°39′N 13°38′E
- Country: Sweden
- Province: Skåne
- County: Skåne County
- Municipality: Sjöbo Municipality

Area
  - Total: 0.89 km^{2} (0.34 sq mi)

Population (31 December 2010)
  - Total: 668
  - Density: 748/km^{2} (1,940/sq mi)
- Time zone: UTC+1 (CET)
  - Summer (DST): UTC+2 (CEST)

Sjöbo sommarby och Svansjö sommarby is a locality situated in Sjöbo Municipality, Skåne County, Sweden with 668 inhabitants in 2010.
