= Blentarp =

- Location within Skåne Location within Sweden
- Coordinates: 55°35′N 13°36′E
- Country: Sweden
- Province: Skåne
- County: Skåne County
- Municipality: Sjöbo Municipality

Area
  - Total: 1.21 km^{2} (0.47 sq mi)

Population (31 December 2010)
  - Total: 1,216
  - Density: 1,003/km^{2} (2,600/sq mi)
- Time zone: UTC+1 (CET)
  - Summer (DST): UTC+2 (CEST)

Blentarp is a locality situated in Sjöbo Municipality, Skåne County, Sweden with 1,216 inhabitants in 2010.

== See also ==
- Henriksdal Spring Tour
