= Sven-Olle Olsson =

Swedish farmer and politician

municipal commissioner in Sjöbo municipality
- In office 1991–1998

Personal details
- Political party: Swedish Centre Party; Sjöbo Party

Sven-Olle Olsson (26 April 1929 - 25 November 2005) was a Swedish farmer and local politician in Sjöbo Municipality, who opposed the idea of Sjöbo Municipality admitting refugees. It led to a referendum in September 1988, where the majority voted against admitting refugees. After the referendum, Sven-Olle was dismissed from the Swedish Centre Party, as Sven-Olle Olsson was accused for connections to the New Swedish Movement.

In 1991, he founded the Sjöbo Party. Between 1991 and 1998, he was municipal commissioner of Sjöbo Municipality.
