= Everlöv Church =

- Everlövs kyrka
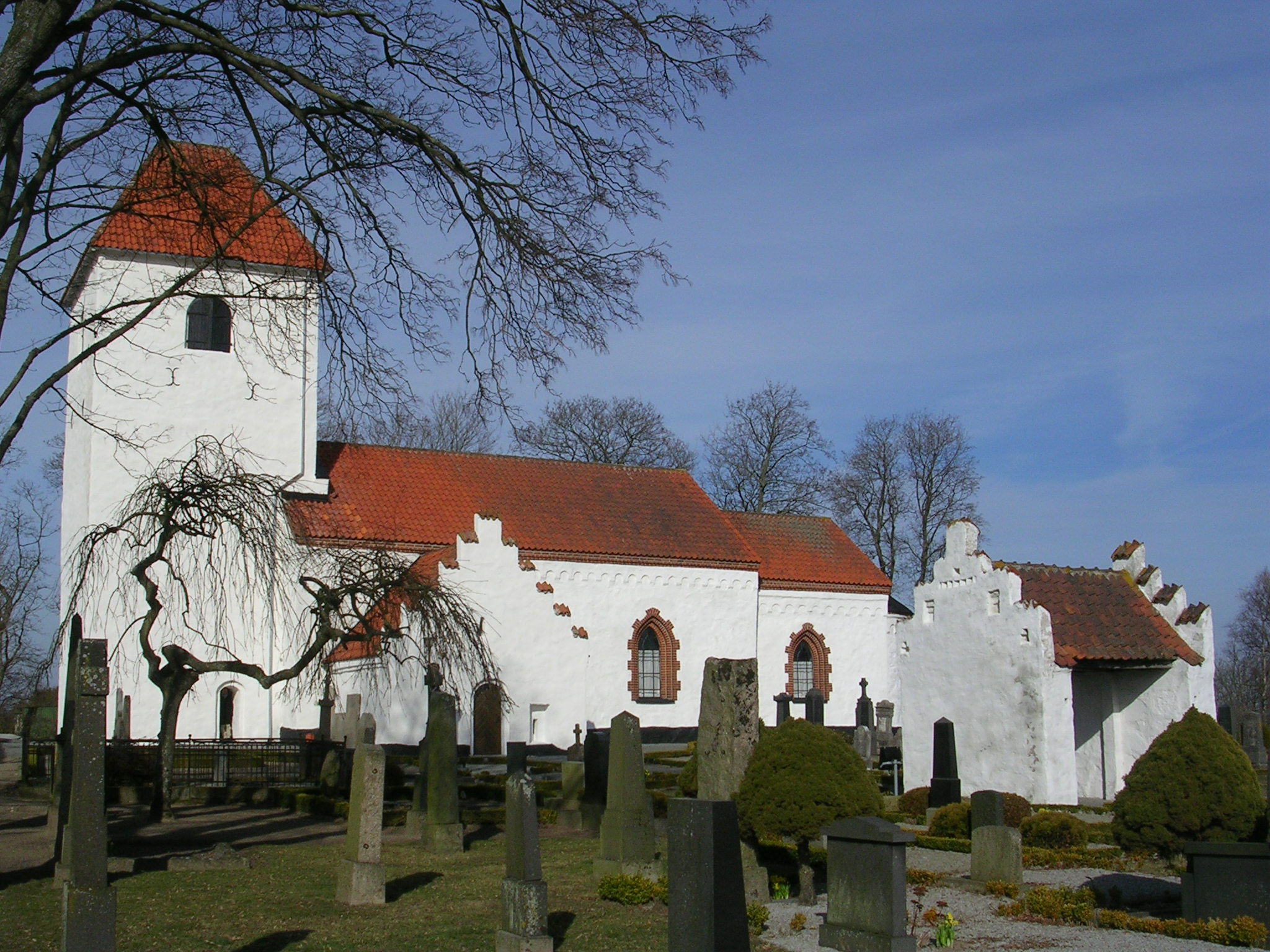
- Everlöv Church

- Location within Skåne Location within Sweden
- 55°36′30″N 13°35′24″E
- Country: Sweden
- Denomination: Church of Sweden

Administration
- Diocese: Lund

Everlöv Church (Swedish: Everlövs kyrka) is a medieval Lutheran church built in the Romanesque style. Located some 14 km (8.7 mi) southwest of Sjöbo in southern Sweden, it belongs to the Diocese of Lund. The church is noted for the many murals which decorate the vaulted ceilings in the nave and the chancel.

== History and architecture ==
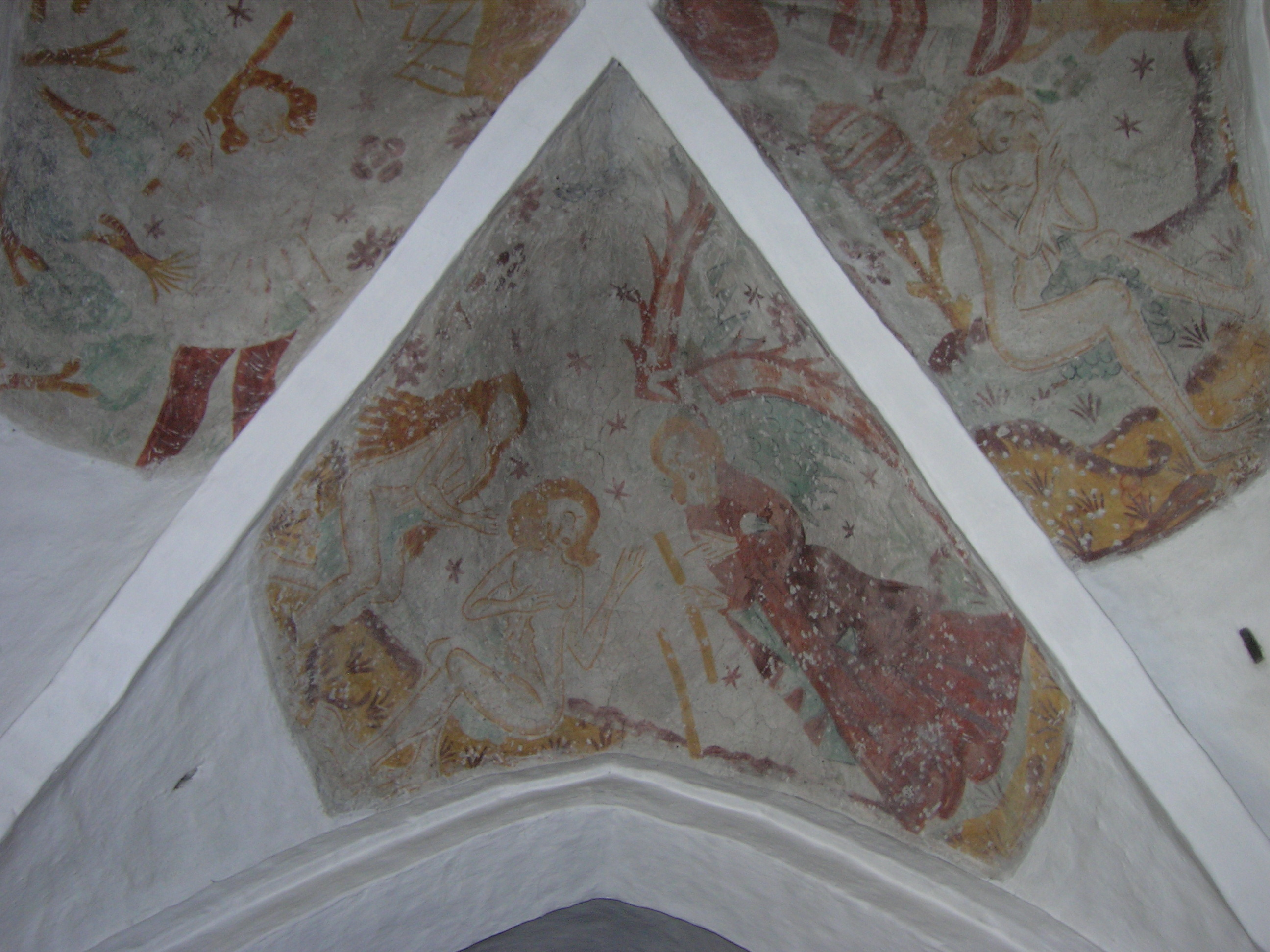
Murals depicting the story of Adam and Eve

The present church was built in the 12th century, replacing an earlier wooden church. It stands on a site that was used as an ancient place of worship. In the 13th century, a broad tower was built at the west end of the building.

== Interior ==
The church originally had a flat wooden ceiling. In the 15th century, it was replaced with vaults. As the nave was unusually wide, two columns were built in the centre of the nave to support them. As a result, six vaults, each with four segments, were built in the nave in addition to a vault with four segments in the chancel. The Baroque altarpiece and pulpit are from 1626.

== Murals ==
The late medieval murals were painted in about 1500 by the so-called Everlöv Workshop which bears strong similarities to the Brarup and Elmelunde Workshops in Denmark. The vaults in the chancel are decorated with paintings of the four Evangelists. Those in the nave include the Creation, Adam and Eve, Lazarus, the Nativity and the seven deadly sins.
