= Sjöbo =

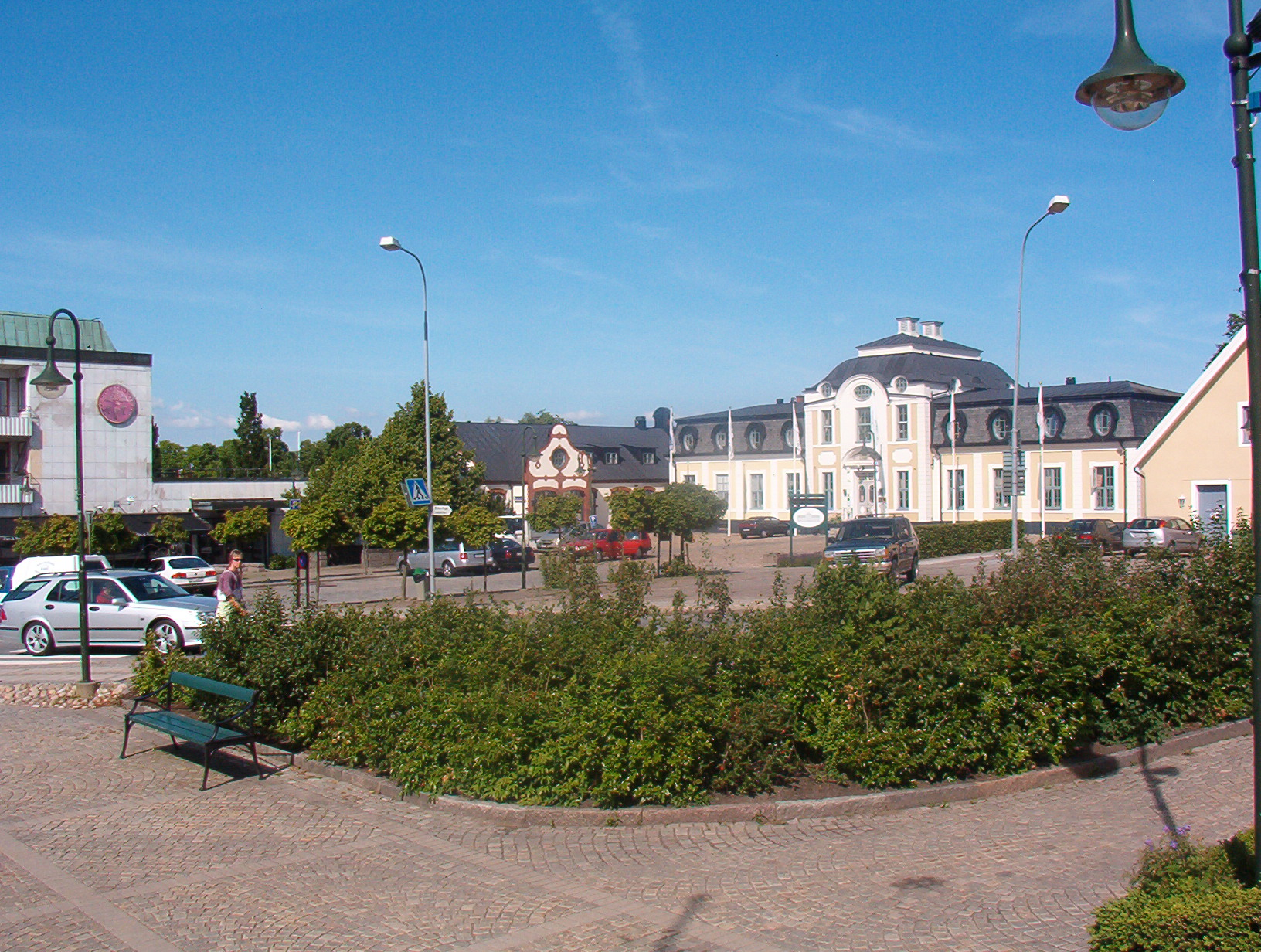
- Central Sjöbo with view over Sjöbo Gästis

- Coat of arms

- Location within Skåne Location within Sweden
- Coordinates: 55°38′N 13°43′E
- Country: Sweden
- Province: Skåne
- County: Skåne County
- Municipality: Sjöbo Municipality

Area
  - Total: 5.67 km^{2} (2.19 sq mi)

Population (31 December 2021)
  - Total: 19,497
  - Density: 39.64/km^{2} (102.7/sq mi)
- Time zone: UTC+1 (CET)
  - Summer (DST): UTC+2 (CEST)

Sjöbo is a locality and the seat of Sjöbo Municipality in Skåne county, Sweden with 6,724 inhabitants in 2010.

== Overview ==
Sjöbo started growing when it became a stop on the railway between Malmö (to the west) and Simrishamn (to the east) in the early 20th century. Today the town of Sjöbo cannot be reached by rail, but a road through central Scania crosses the municipality and town, while another large road from east to west also crosses it.

Sjöbo holds the Guinness World Record for the biggest "rulltårta" ever made. "Spettekaka" ("spit cake") is a cake made out of flour, sugar and eggs and baked on a type of rotisserie, or 'spit'.

The town is also associated with many cases of opposition to immigration (see Refugee controversy in Sjöbo). In the 2010 election, the anti-immigration Sweden Democrats received 16% of the vote, the highest of any municipality. and also the highest results in the new elections of 2014 with 30%, 40% in 2018, and 43% in 2022.
