= Nymö Church =

Church in Nymö, Scania, Sweden

- Nymö kyrka
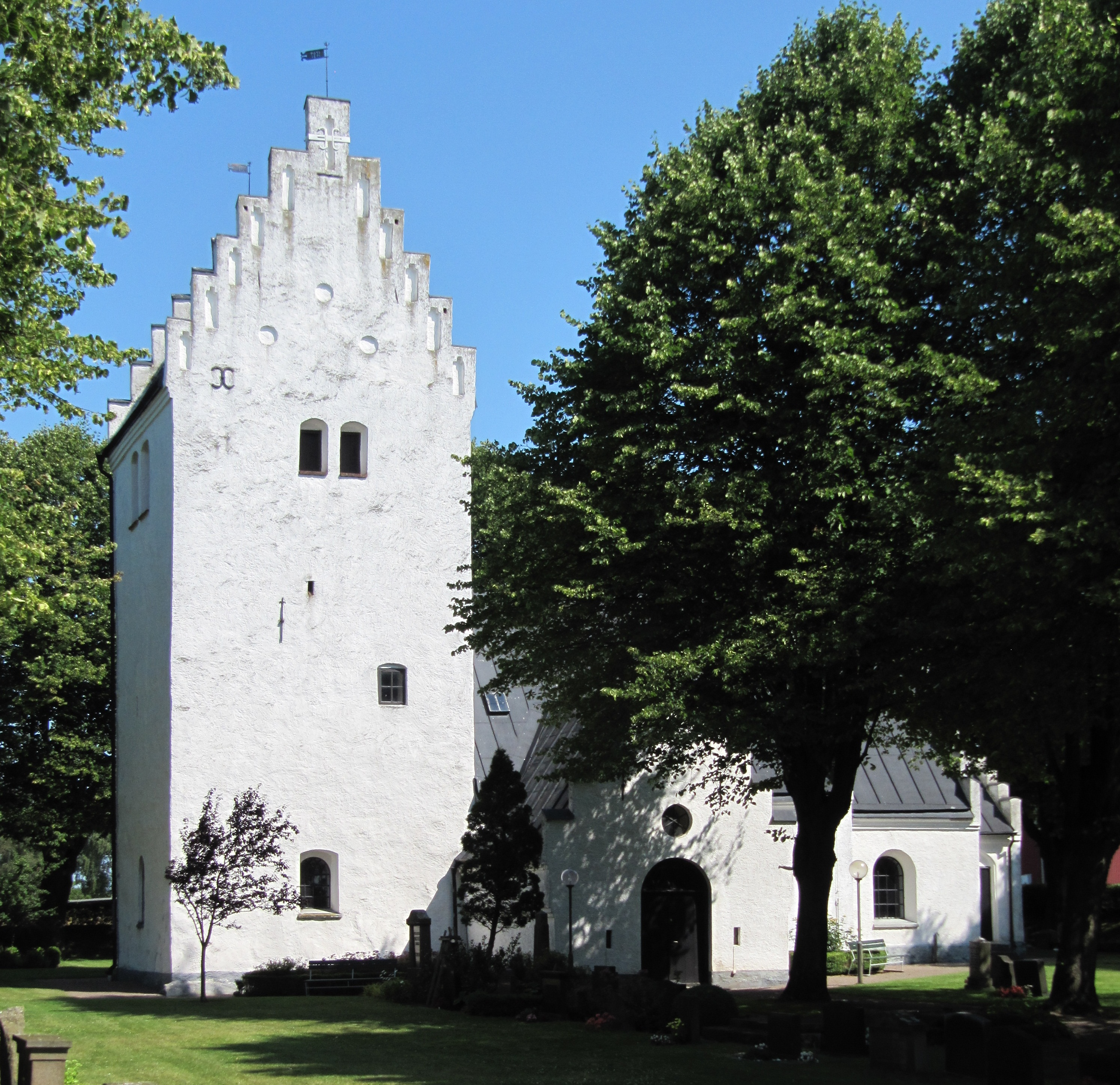
- Nymö Church

- Location within Skåne Location within Sweden Location within Europe
- 56°01′06″N 14°19′31″E
- Country: Sweden
- Denomination: Church of Sweden

Nymö Church (Swedish: Nymö kyrka) is a medieval church in Nymö, Scania, Sweden. It belongs to the Church of Sweden. It dates from the 13th century and was a popular pilgrimage church during the Middle Ages. In 1996, medieval murals were discovered and restored in the nave of the church.

== History ==
Nymö Church was built during the middle of the 13th century in a transitional style between Romanesque and Gothic. During the Middle Ages it was a popular pilgrimage church, tied to the cult of Saint Olaf. A church porch was added in the 14th century, and during the 15th century the vaults of the nave and chancel were constructed. The church tower dates from the same century, though it was enlarged in 1760. The sacristy was added in the 1840s. The church was renovated in 1932 and again in 1996, when medieval murals were discovered under layers of whitewash in the nave; these were subsequently uncovered and restored.

== Murals and furnishings ==
The murals in the nave are in the same style as those found in Vittskövle Church, and depict scenes from the Book of Genesis. Oldest among the church furnishings is the sandstone baptismal font, from the building period of the church. The rood cross is from the 13th century and displayed on the north wall of the church. The altarpiece is from 1667 and made by a craftsman in Ystad; the pulpit is dated to 1626.
