= Uppsala Tramway =

Planned tram system in Uppsala, Sweden

Overview
- Native name: Uppsala spårväg
- Owner: Region Uppsala
- Locale: Uppsala, Sweden
- Transit type: Tram
- Number of lines: 2 (planned)
- Number of stations: 22

Operation
- Operation will start: 2029
- Operator: Region Uppsala
- Infrastructure manager: UL

Technical
- System length: 17 km (11 mi)
- Track gauge: 1,435 mm (4 ft 8 1/2 in) (standard gauge)

The Uppsala Tramway (Swedish: Uppsala spårväg) is a planned tramway system under construction in Uppsala, Sweden. The first phase comprises a 17 km (11 mi) double-track network with 22 stops served by two routes between Uppsala Central Station, Gottsunda, Ultuna and the planned Bergsbrunna station.

Preparatory construction began in 2024 and passenger service is planned to begin in 2029.

The project forms part of Uppsala Municipality's strategy for urban development and public transport, aiming to support population growth in the region.

It will be the first tram system in the city since the closure of the original Uppsala tramways in 1953.

== History ==
=== Original tramway network (1906-1953) ===
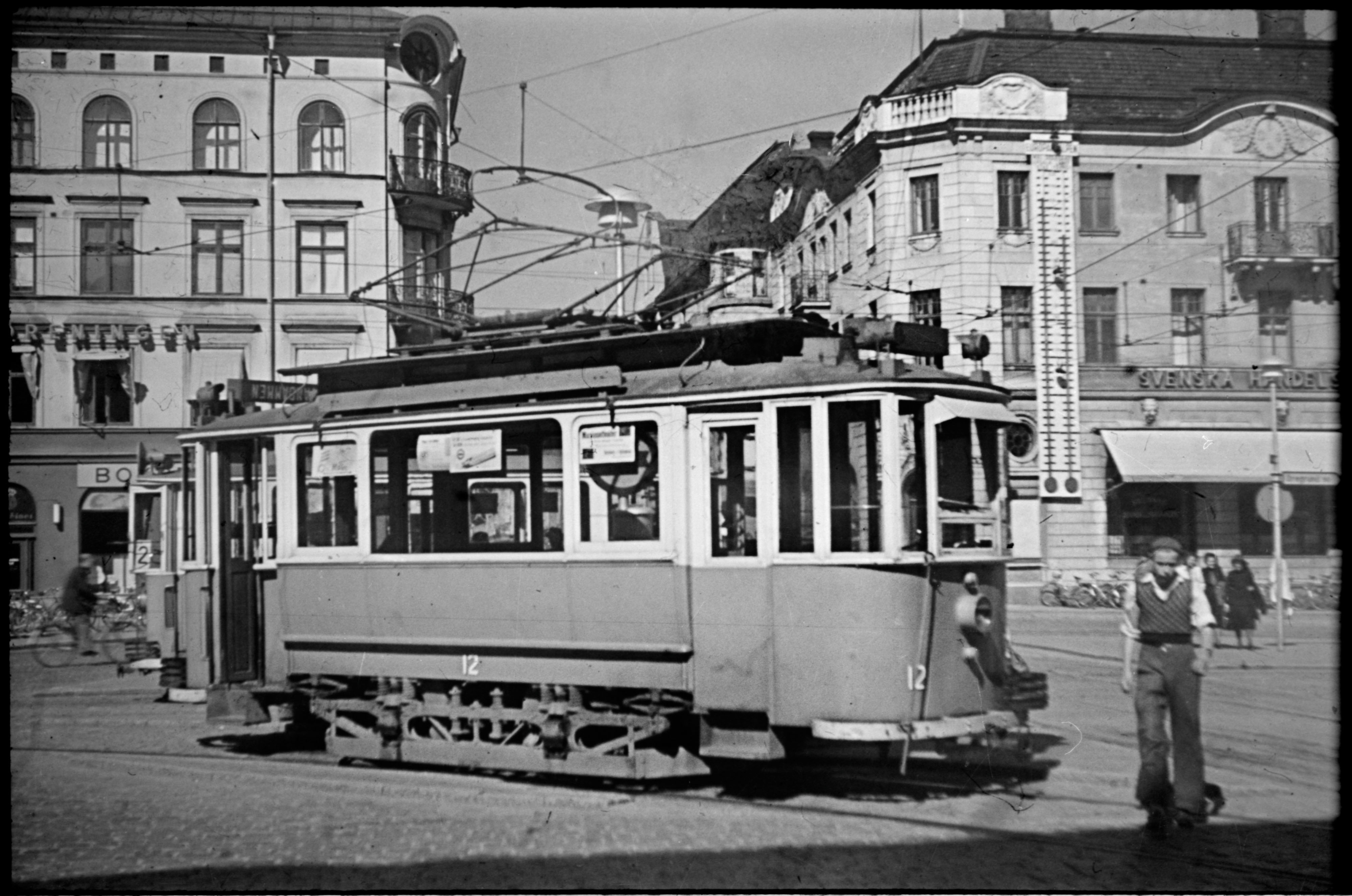
Tram 12 Uppsala, 1950

Uppsala previously operated a tramway system between 1906 and 1953. The network eventually comprised five routes, including the Graneberg line, opened in 1928 as Sweden's first rapid tramway to a lakeside suburb on Lake Mälaren.

At its greatest extent, the system connected the city centre with Svartbäcken, Erikslund, Polacksbacken, Almtuna and Graneberg. The network was largely single-track with passing loops, limiting capacity.

Following a depot fire in 1945 that destroyed much of the fleet, operations were significantly reduced. The system was gradually replaced by buses as car traffic increased in the post-war period, and the final tram service closed on 12 October 1953.

=== Modern tramway plans (2010–present) ===
Planning for a new tramway began in 2010 as part of Uppsala Municipality's long-term transport strategy. A 2020 feasibility study comparing tram and bus rapid transit concluded that tramway infrastructure best supported the city's projected growth.

In December 2021, the municipal council approved construction subject to state co-financing, which was later confirmed through Sweden's Urban Environment Agreement programme in 2022. A groundbreaking ceremony was held on 22 August 2024, marking the start of utility relocation works.

The tramway is intended to support planned urban expansion in southern Uppsala and improved regional rail connectivity via the East Coast Line and the planned Bergsbrunna station. By 2050, the system is expected to carry approximately 100,000 passenger journeys per day.

== Route ==
The tramway will consist of approximately 17 km (11 mi) of double track with 22 stops. Two routes will operate between Uppsala Central Station and the planned Bergsbrunna station, sharing a central section before splitting south of Uppsala University Hospital.

The western branch will serve Rosendal and Gottsunda, while the eastern branch will pass through Ultuna and Ulleråker. The branches will rejoin before crossing the Fyris River on a new bridge and continuing via Nåntuna to Bergsbrunna.

The line will serve major regional destinations including Uppsala University Hospital, the Swedish University of Agricultural Sciences, Uppsala Biomedical Centre and Uppsala Science Park.

=== Services ===
Two service routes are planned:

- Line 1: Bergsbrunna – Gottsunda – Uppsala Central Station
- Line 2: Bergsbrunna – Ultuna – Uppsala Central Station

== Construction ==
Construction is being carried out in phases, beginning with relocation of underground utilities and preparatory infrastructure works. A tram depot is being built near Nåntuna, and a new bridge over the Fyris River will connect the Ultuna and Nåntuna sections of the route. The project is scheduled for completion and opening in 2029.

== Rolling stock ==
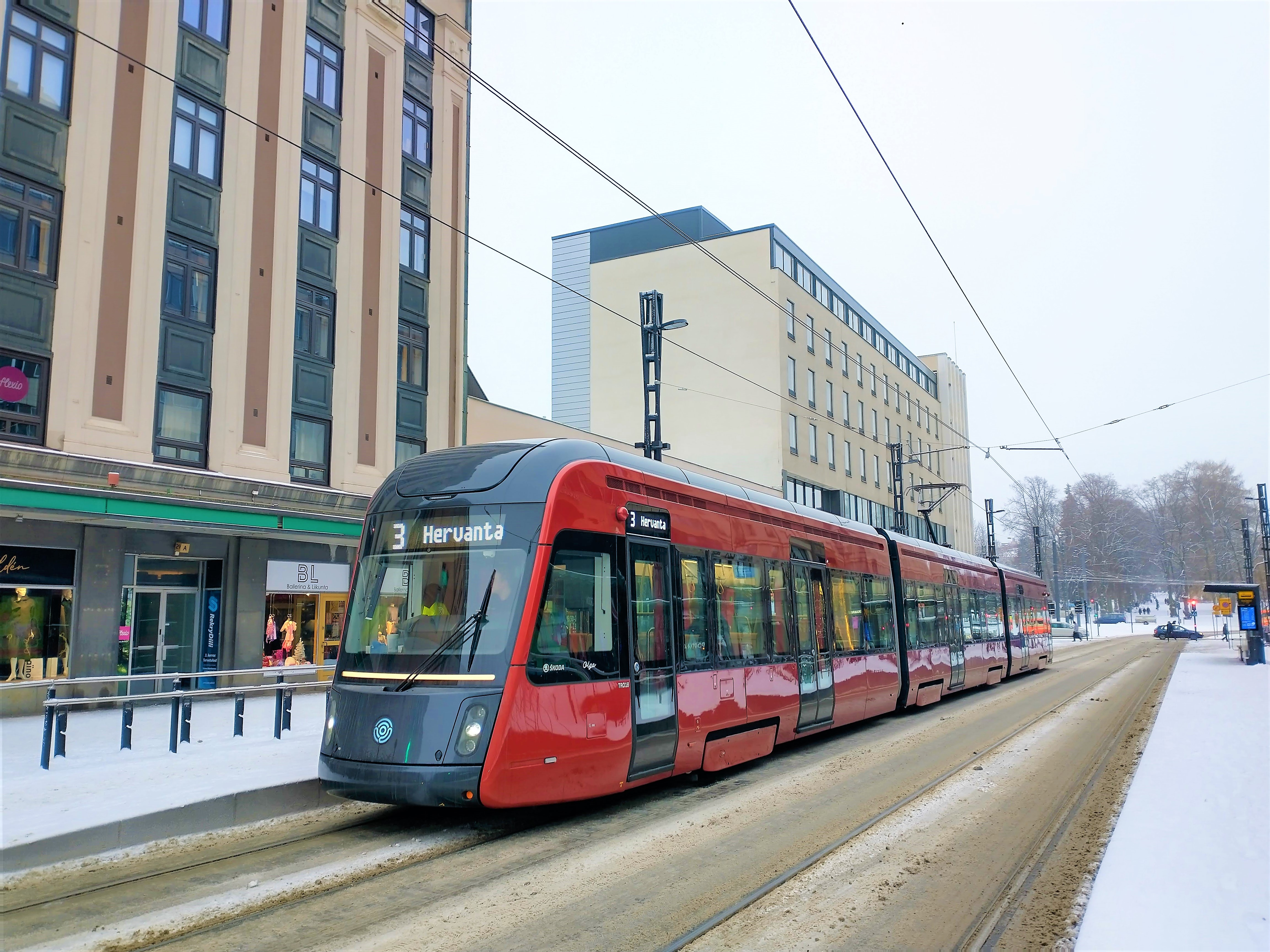
The trams selected for Uppsala are derived from the design used on the Tampere light rail.

The tram fleet will be owned by the Swedish rolling stock company Transitio and leased to Region Uppsala.

An initial fleet of 20 bidirectional low-floor trams will be delivered by Škoda Transtech. The vehicles will be approximately 38 metres long and have a capacity of around 186 passengers. The design is based on vehicles supplied for the Tampere light rail system in Finland.

== Funding ==
The first phase of the tramway is estimated to cost approximately SEK 12.1 billion (2024 prices).

Funding source	Contribution
Swedish state	SEK 3.1 billion
Uppsala Municipality	SEK 7.5 billion
Region Uppsala	SEK 1.5 billion

State funding is provided through agreements supporting sustainable urban development and housing construction, while Region Uppsala is responsible for the tram depot and rolling stock.

== See also ==
- Lund tramway
- List of town tramway systems in Sweden
- Transport in Sweden
