= Gottsunda Parish =

Church of Sweden parish in Uppsala deanery

Coordinates: 59.8095°N 17.628603°E

Gottsunda Parish (Swedish: Gottsunda församling) is a parish in Uppsala Deanery (Swedish: Uppsala pastorat) and Uppsala archeaconry (Swedish: Uppsala kontrakt) in the Archdiocese of Uppsala. The parish is located in Uppsala Municipality in Uppsala County.

Gottsunda parish includes the localities of Gottsunda, Valsätra, Ulleråker, Ultuna, Sunnersta, Graneberg and Vårdsätra. Ultuna is dominated by the Swedish University of Agricultural Sciences.

== Administrative history ==
The parish was formed in 1974 by breaking away from the parish of Helga Trefaldighet ("Holy Trinity"; formerly Bondkyrka) and then constituted its own deanery until 2014. Since 2014 the parish has been part of Uppsala Deanery.

== Area ==
Gottsunda parish covered on 1 November 1975, (according to the division of 1 January 1976) an area of 16.8 square kilometers, of which 16.8 square kilometers of land.
