= History of Uppsala =

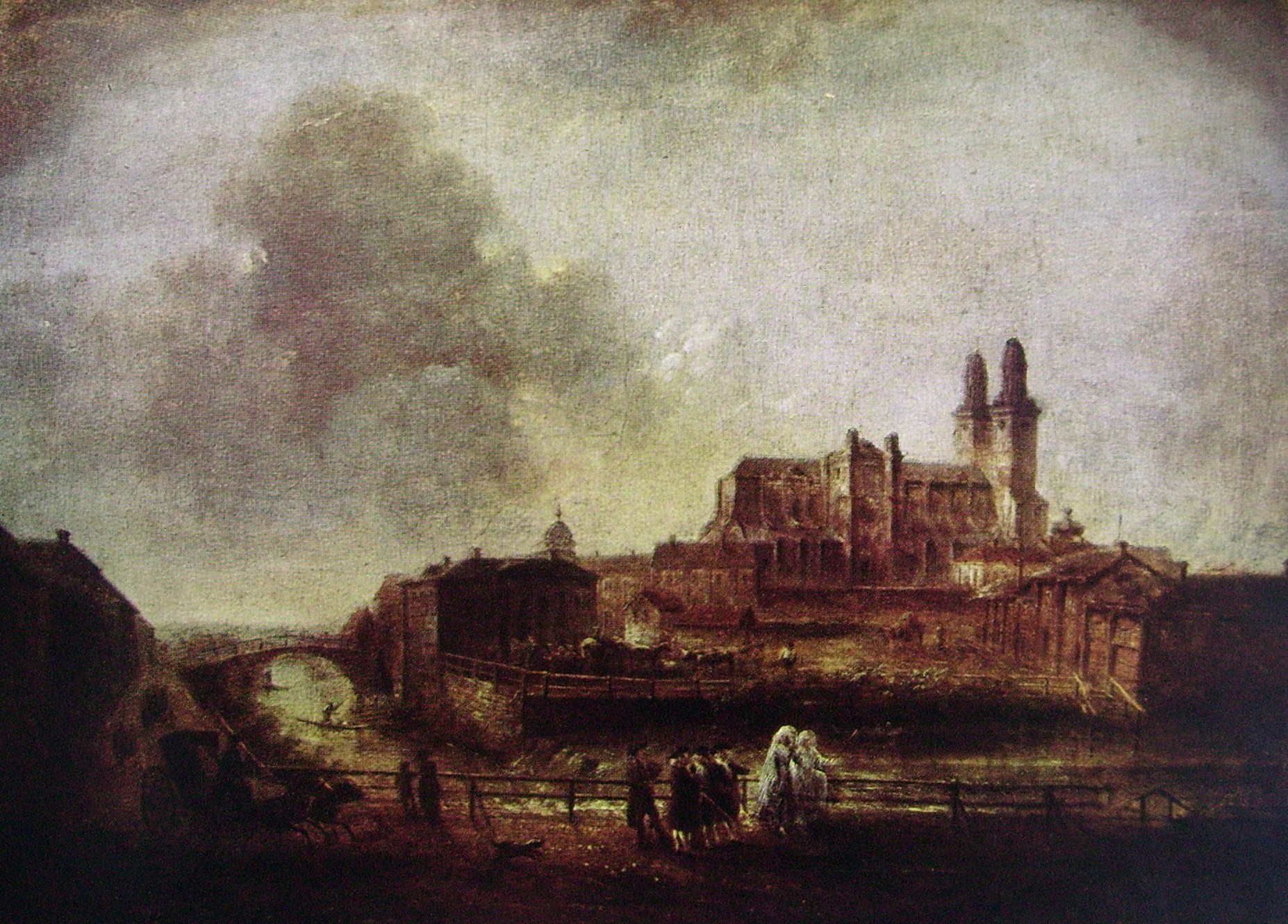
Uppsala in the 18th century, by Elias Martin

The city of Uppsala is one of the oldest in Sweden. It has played a dominant role in the political, intellectual and historical development of the country. The two main institutions in the history of Uppsala are the Archdiocese which is located in the city, and Uppsala University, founded in the city in 1477. These have long been established on the western banks of the Fyris river with a trading town on the other side of the river.

== Before 1087: Pre-Christian Uppsala ==
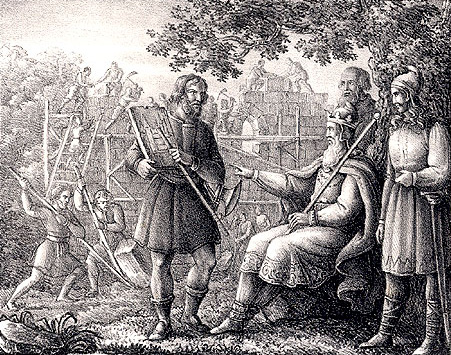
Freyr erecting the Temple at Uppsala

The site where Uppsala stands is a fertile plain. The city lies in the intersection of the esker Uppsalaåsen and the river Fyrisån. In prehistoric times, most of the area was below sea level. Therefore, the first communities in the area were established at a higher altitude in Gamla Uppsala (old Uppsala), about 5 kilometres (3.1 mi) north of the current city. In the 3rd and 4th centuries, old Uppsala grew into an important religious and political centre, with both the pagan Temple at Uppsala and the Thing of all Swedes in the town.

According to the mythological Heimskringla, the city was founded during the reign of Augustus by the pagan god Freyr.

== 1087–1519: Medieval Uppsala ==
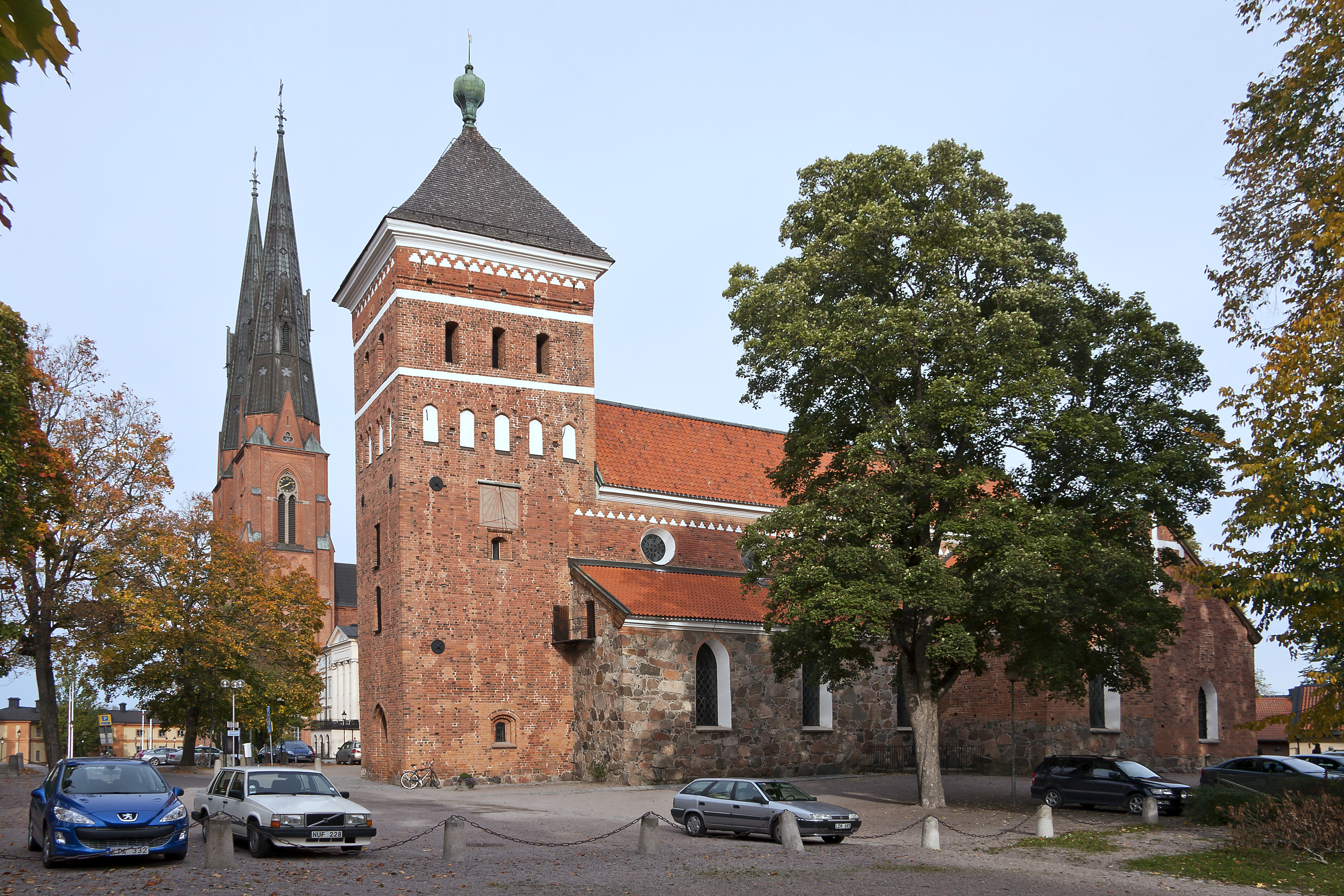
Helga Trefaldighets kyrka and Uppsala cathedral

In 1087 the temple at Uppsala was burned as a part of the Christianisation of Sweden. In 1164 Gamla Uppsala became the seat of the Swedish Archdiocese. Due to isostasy the shoreline had moved down from Gamla Uppsala, and in the 6th century the Fyris River was not navigable by sail north of Kvarnfallet in the current city of Uppsala. At this site the modern city of Uppsala was founded as a port city to Gamla Uppsala, under the name of Aros. In the first centuries of the second millennium the port city outgrew Gamla Uppsala, which became increasingly isolated. In 1273 the Archdiocese was moved from Gamla Uppsala to Aros, on the condition that the name Uppsala moved with the Archdiocese, which is how the city got its current name. After the relocation the construction of Uppsala cathedral began, continuing until 1435 when the cathedral was inaugurated.

In 1477 Uppsala University was founded through a papal bull as the first university in northern Europe.

== 1520–1701: Vasa era ==
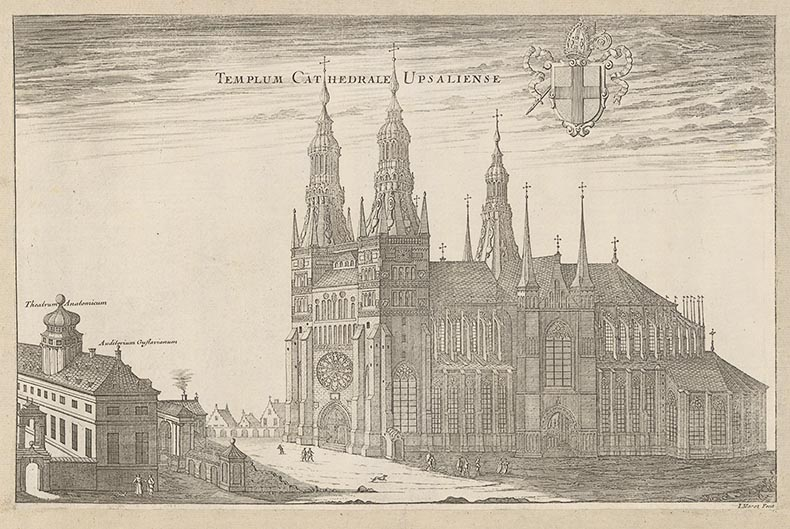
Uppsala in Suecia antiqua et hodierna

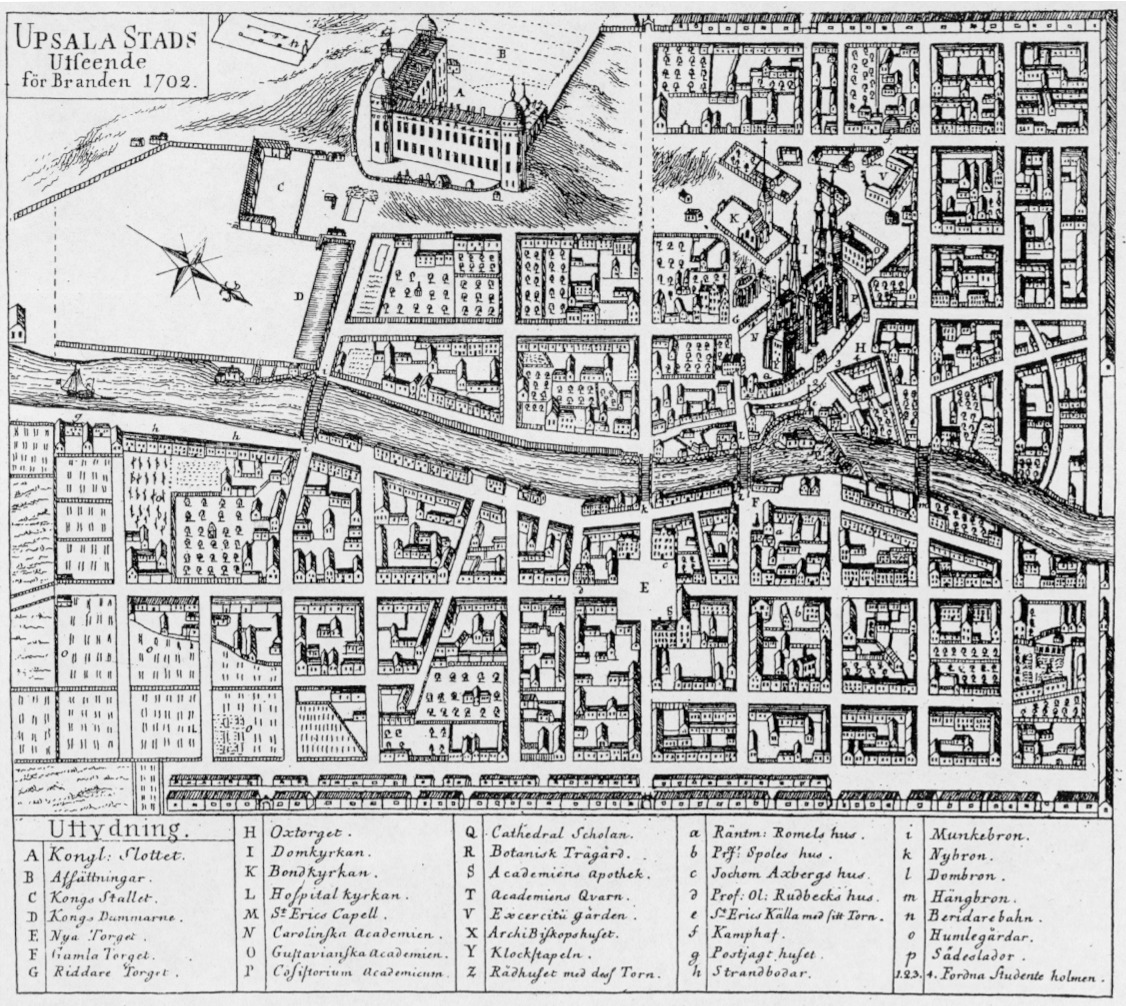
City map from 1702, before the great city fire

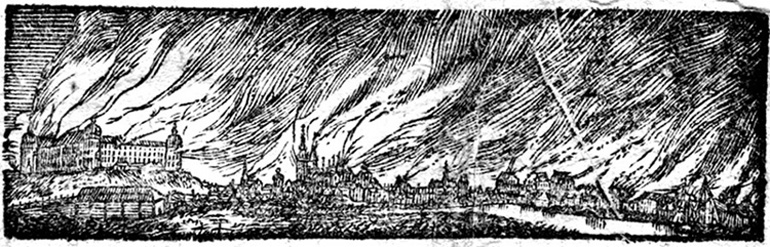
1702 fire in Uppsala

In 1523 Gustav Vasa seized power in Sweden. During his reign Uppsala experienced a severe decline. The ecclesiastical city was largely affected by his reduction and the university closed due to lack of funds. As a result of the Protestant Reformation much of the church's power moved from Uppsala to the royal court in Stockholm. As a demonstration and consolidation of his power King Gustav began the building of a large fortification on Uppsalaåsen, Uppsala Castle, in 1549.

In the 16th century several important church meetings were held in Uppsala. A new Church Ordinance was accepted in 1571, and in 1593 the Uppsala Synod took place. During the meeting the Augsburg Confession was accepted as the sole religious doctrine and the university was reopened. However, the university took several more decades to resume its full functioning.

During the Swedish Empire Uppsala flourished and became viewed as the second capital of the empire. Through large donations from King Gustav II Adolf the university experienced a renaissance. The king realized the benefits of building his empire with not only military but also intellectual means. In the 1620s a new main building for the university was raised, Gustavianum, and in 1622 the world's first professorship in political science was founded, financed by Johan Skytte. In 1663 the student nations at Uppsala university were legalized by the Konsistorium (the university's decision-making body), and in the same year education in Exercitieinstitutionen was introduced, in an effort to provide the empire with competent military and civil servicemen.

In 1643 Uppsala adopted its first city plan. The medieval town with irregular street patterns was to a large extent demolished and a new city with straight streets and diamond-shaped blocks was built within an 800 by 1,200 metres (0.50 by 0.75 mi) large urban square. The plan was mostly completed by 1660. The area near the cathedral was not included in the city plan, and therefore these buildings are the oldest still standing in the city.

== 1702–1809: Age of Liberty and the Gustavian era ==
On 16 May 1702 much of the city was destroyed in a large fire. The cathedral was one of several buildings severely damaged. It took decades to rebuild the city and after the fire it lost its position as a second capital of Sweden.

Uppsala was greatly affected by the ideals of the Age of Enlightenment. Many of Sweden's most eminent persons of the enlightenment lived and worked in the city. Among these were the mathematician Samuel Klingenstierna, the astronomer Anders Celsius, the physician Nils Rosén von Rosenstein, the biologist Carl von Linné and the humanist and linguist Johan Ihre.

In the 18th century the bourgeois trading town declined due to competition from the growing capital Stockholm. The university also experienced a set-back during the end of the century due to the deaths of many of its most prominent scientists and the political turmoil in Europe caused by the French revolution.

== 1810–1905: Union era ==
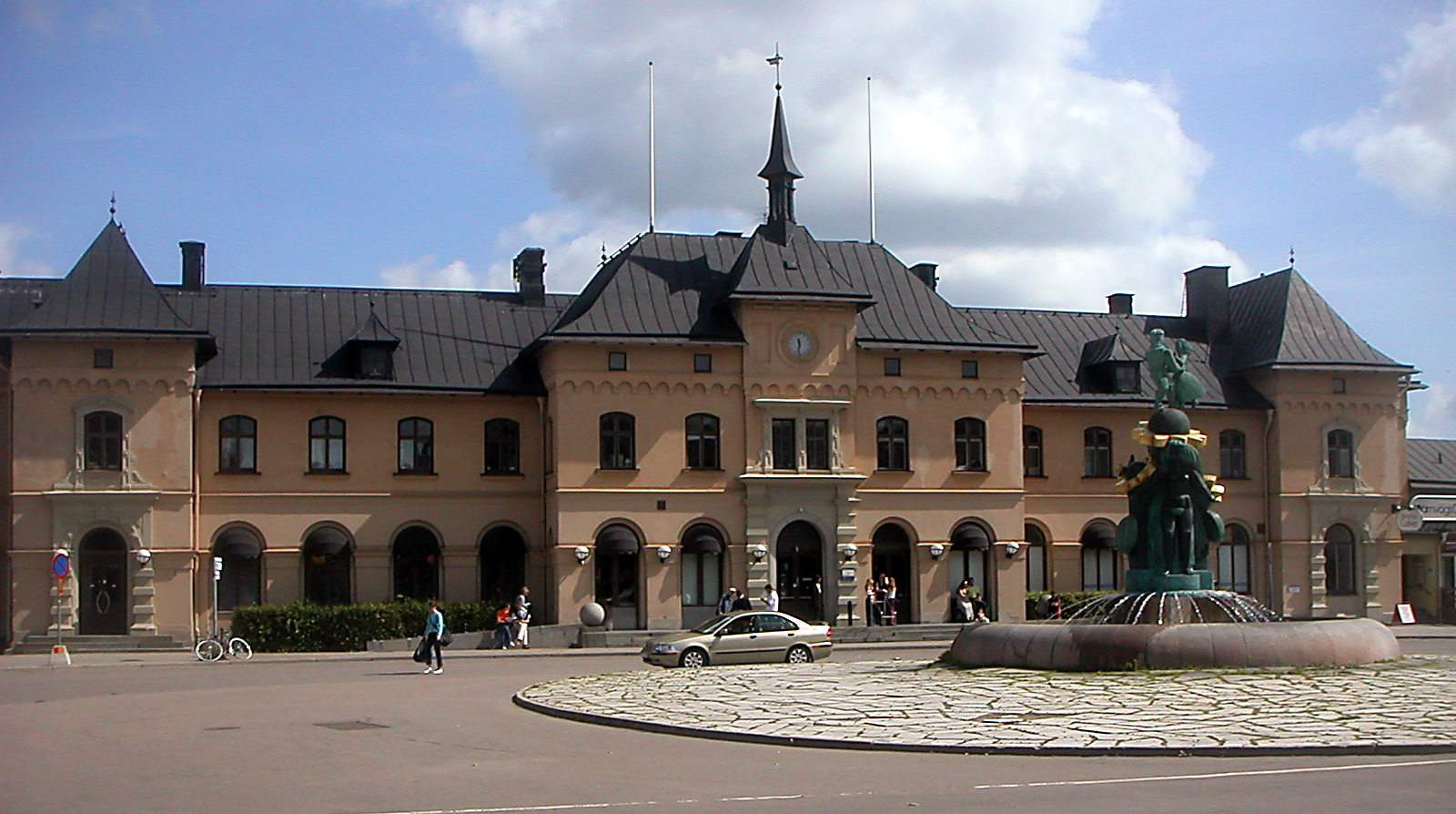
Uppsala Central Station, opened in 1866.

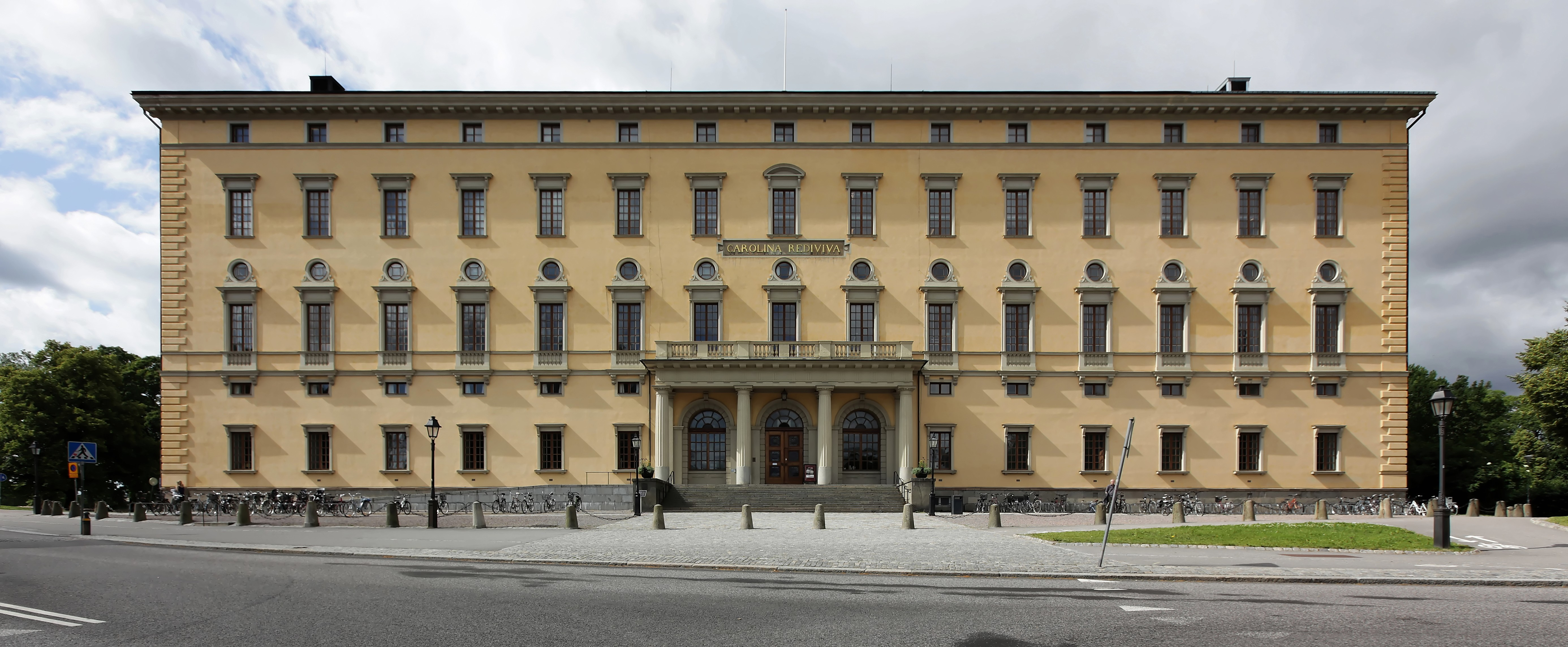
Carolina Rediviva, built in 1841.

During the first half of the 19th century the university was largely affected by the ideals of romanticism. A group of intellectuals in the city, including Per Daniel Amadeus Atterbom, Lorenzo Hammarsköld and Erik Gustaf Geijer became known as the Uppsala romantics. By contrast, in the second half of the century the university was dominated by ideals of natural science. In the 50-year period 1820–1870 the number of students at the university tripled, from 500 persons to 1500. In 1870 women were allowed to study at the university and in 1872 Betty Pettersson became the first woman to graduate from a university in Sweden. During this era many university buildings were erected. In 1841 the new university library Carolina Rediviva was inaugurated, In 1867 the university hospital opened and in 1887 King Oscar II of Sweden inaugurated the university hall. During these years the student nations also obtained their own buildings. In 1843, 1856 and 1875 Uppsala hosted Nordic student meetings.

In 1866 Uppsala Central Station opened which made large scale industrialization in Uppsala possible. The area lacks typical natural resources such as ore and wood, but the soil is fertile. Therefore, the food industry and production of bricks from the muddy soil both grew as businesses in Uppsala.

These factors caused a large population growth in the city. Between 1870 and 1900 the population doubled from 11,433 to 22,818 inhabitants. For the first time the city expanded outside of the old city square which was plotted in the city plan of 1643. The city expanded into the districts of Luthagen and Svartbäcken in the north, and Vaksala in the east.

== 1907–1945: War era ==
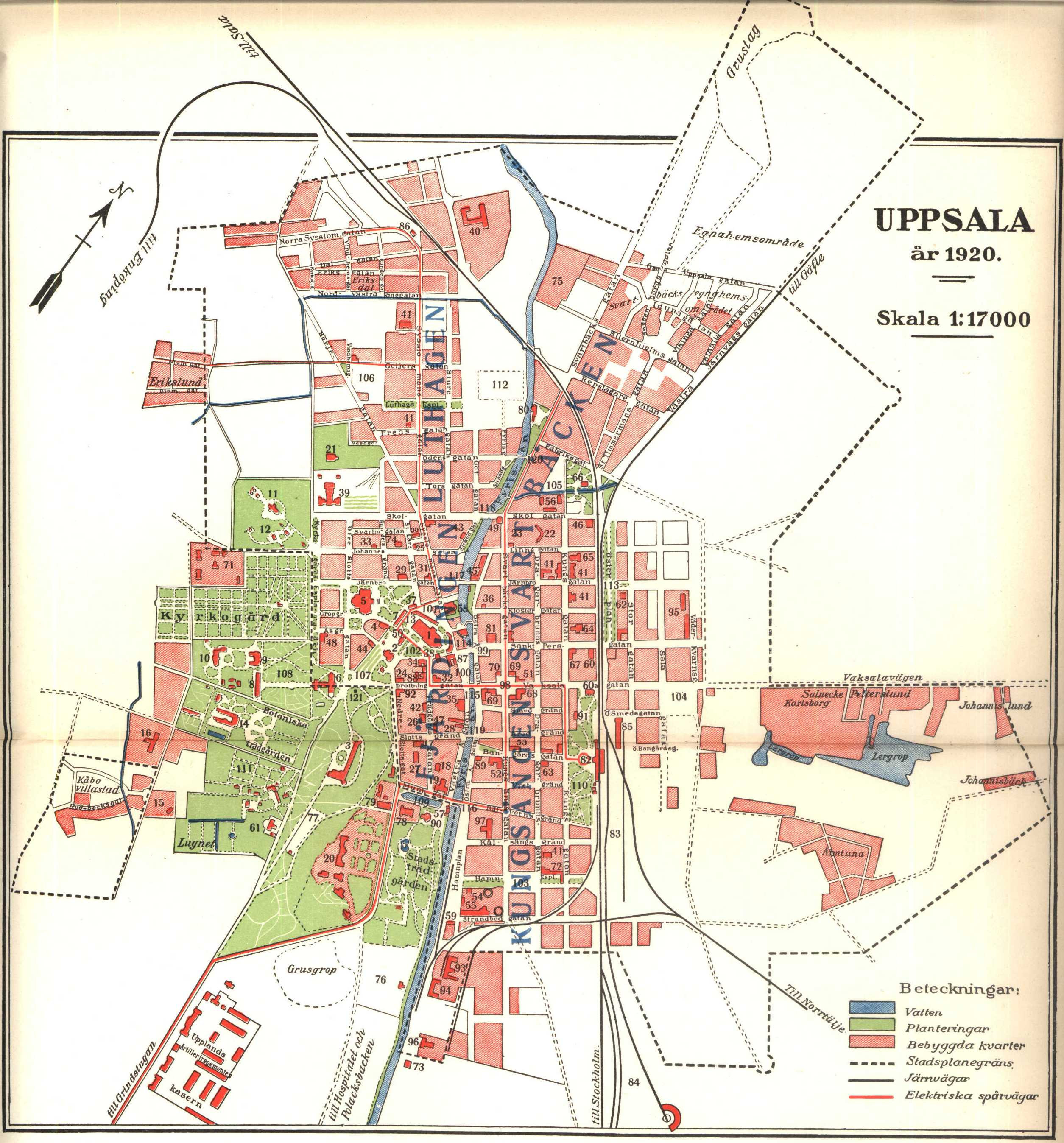
Map of Uppsala from 1920

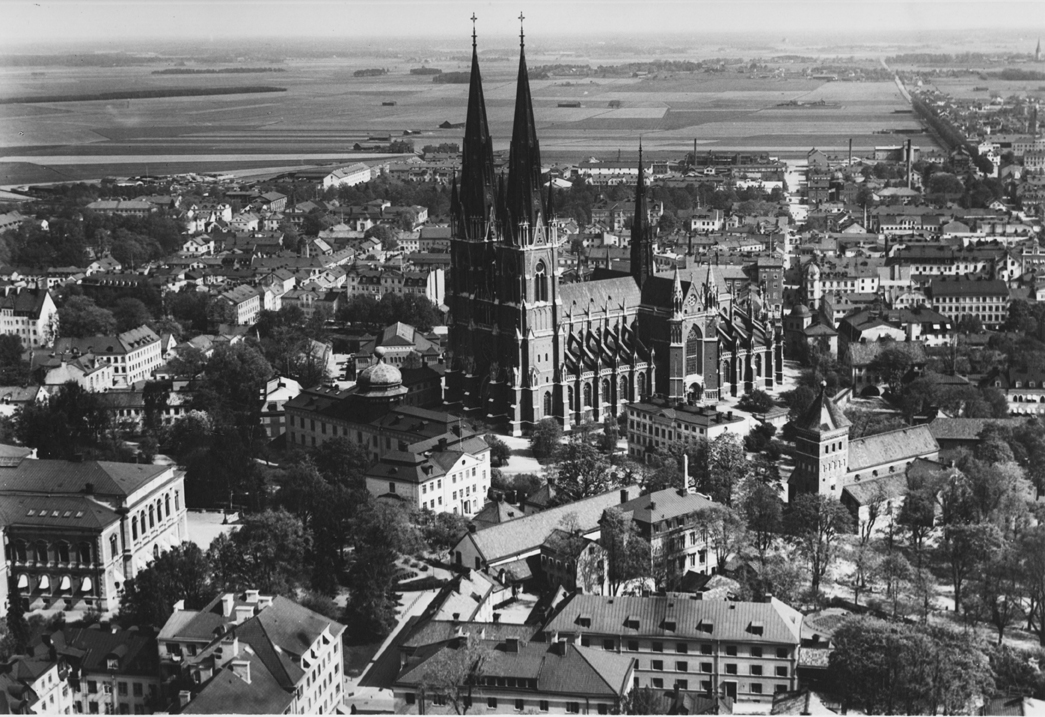
Aeral view of Uppsala, 1940.

In 1921 the State Institute for Racial Biology, known as the Statens institut för rasbiologi, was established in Uppsala as a governmental agency for eugenics. It was the world's first of its kind. The pro-Nazi physician Herman Bernhard Lundborg was appointed as the first head of the institute, but after he was removed and replaced by Gunnar Dahlberg in 1936 the institute developed towards a less racist and more medicinal and statistical direction. In 1939 Bollhusmötet, "the ball house meeting", took place in Uppsala. It was organized by the student body at the university. A majority of the assembly made an official protest against accepting ten Jewish academic refugees from Nazi Germany.

During the war era the philosophy faculty at the university grew, and subjects like archaeology, art history and modern languages were introduced. Among the most eminent professors at the university were The Svedberg, Arne Tiselius, Harald Hjärne, Adolf Noreen and Nathan Söderblom. A meta-ethical emotivist view called Uppsalafilosofin, the Uppsala school, was introduced by Axel Hägerström and his students, which inspired the development of the legal view Uppsalaskolan. Between the years 1880 and 1945 the number of students at the university tripled from 1500 to 4500, and Uppsala was one of the fastest-growing cities in Sweden.

== 1946–present: Modern Uppsala ==
In the post-war era Uppsala has experienced comprehensive urban renewal. Unlike most of Europe, Sweden never participated in World War II, so its pre-war infrastructure was intact. But due to severe repair needs and modernistic ideals most of the old city was demolished. Instead, a new city centre was erected, mostly in modernistic and functionalistic style. However, similarly to the demolition and redesign of the city in 1643 the area around the cathedral were left standing.

In the 50-year period between 1940 and 1990 the population of Uppsala municipality more than doubled, growing from 74,000 inhabitants to 156,000. This increased the need for city expansion, which was made possible due to the post–World War II economic expansion. In the Million Programme-era of the 1960s and 1970s several new districts such as Flogsta, Gottsunda, Nyby, Sunnersta and Gränby were built.

The number of university students increased rapidly, from 8,000 in 1960 to 21,000 in 1970. During the tenure of the principal Torgny T:son Segerstedt from 1955 to 1978 more students were admitted to the university than during its entire earlier history combined. Simultaneously Uppsala underwent severe de-industrialisation, with many of the 19th century enterprises shutting down.

In 2011 the population of Uppsala municipality surpassed 200,000 persons.
