= Storvreta =

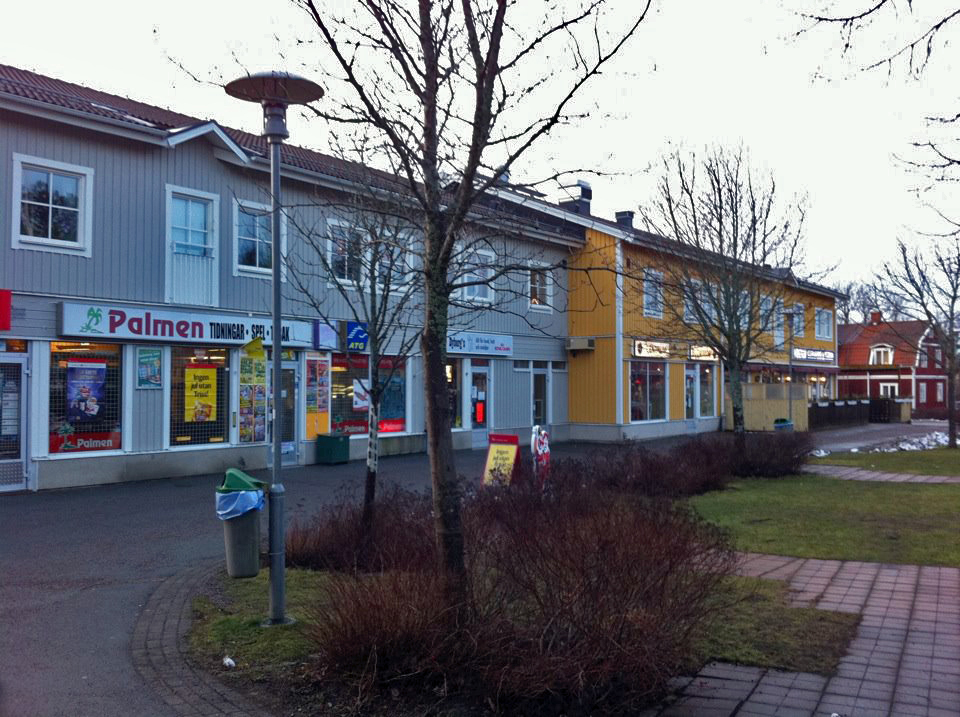
- Shops in Storvreta

- Location within Uppsala Location within Sweden
- Coordinates: 59°58′N 17°42′E
- Country: Sweden
- Province: Uppland
- County: Uppsala County
- Municipality: Uppsala Municipality

Area
  - Total: 3.04 km^{2} (1.17 sq mi)

Population (31 December 2020)
  - Total: 6,360
  - Density: 2,090/km^{2} (5,420/sq mi)
- Time zone: UTC+1 (CET)
  - Summer (DST): UTC+2 (CEST)

Storvreta is a locality in Uppsala Municipality, Uppsala County, Sweden with 6,347 inhabitants in 2010. It is located 15 kilometers north of Uppsala.

== History ==
=== Prehistory ===
Archeological investigations have found Stone Age and Bronze Age habitations and grave fields in the area. Although some of the graves found near today's village may be from the Mesolithic or Neolithic era, most of the habitable land had not risen from the sea following the most recent Ice Age until the centuries around 2000 BC.

=== Agricultural village ===
For thousands of years, the inhabitants in the area were farmers, making their living off the fertile land which had formerly been below the sea level. In 1539, under the reign of Gustav Vasa, a land register was made for Rasbo Hundred, in which Storvreta was mentioned. The village then included four agricultural properties (hemman) according to the register, although it is possible that smaller farms were taxed together and counted as one property. In connection with the laga skiftet, an agrarian reform from 1827 aiming to create larger areas of arable land, which was carried out in Rasbo Hundred in 1851–1852, ten agricultural properties were recorded in Storvreta village. In addition, there were a few smaller farms and torps (crofts) belonging to Storvreta, including a soldattorp for a tenement soldier.

The railway between Uppsala and Gävle, the work on which had been begun in 1872, was finished in September, 1874, when the railroad tracks from Gävle in the north and Uppsala in the south were connected in Storvreta, by the new station house which had been built earlier that year. The railway was formally opened in December, 1874. As a result of the improved communications, Storvreta grew and transformed from an agrarian village into a centre for industries, the most important being furniture manufacture.

=== Industries ===
Johan Erik Blomqvist was the first of the village's industrialists; he moved to Storvreta in 1892 and initially manufactured furniture in his home. In the year 1900, Blomqvist built a furniture factory in central Storvreta and moved his production there. The Blomqvist factory manufactured furnishings for banks, shops and university departments. In 1925, a desk manufactured by the company won a prize at the World's Fair in Paris, and following that, the Royal Court of Sweden and Nationalmuseum commissioned furniture from Blomqvist's. J E Blomkvist's son Jabez Blomqvist continued running the business after his father's death in 1949. In its heyday, the factory employed up to 50 people. Two roads in Storvreta have been named after J E Blomqvist, who in addition to his furniture making also worked as a lay preacher, and built a church for the Mission Covenant Church of Sweden in the village. Jabez Blomqvist retired in 1966 and the firm passed to another owner, who closed it down a few years later.

Another furniture manufacturer in Storvreta was Anton Lund, who began working at Blomqvist's in 1916, but quit his job and opened his own manufacture in 1920. Lund's factory, which employed 12 people, produced beds and other furniture, and also skis manufactured and glued together according to a system invented by Lund. The firm closed down when Lund retired.

The largest furniture manufacturing industry in Storvreta was AB K J Pettersson and Sons. Like Lund, Karl Julius (K J) Pettersson worked for Blomqvist's furniture company. In 1933, he started a small-scale manufacturing business of his own, together with his four sons Gösta, Nils, Karl-Erik and Birger. The production grew, and Pettersson built a larger factory and a furniture shop. In 1953 yet another larger factory building, which still exists, was built in the Lyckebo area of Storvreta. The company specialised in sofa beds with patented constructions, as well as other furniture. When the first dedicated student housing was built in Uppsala, Pettersson's were commissioned to deliver the furnishings. The firm employed 50-60 people in low season, and about 100 people in high season. A large furniture shop was built near the E4 motorway in Svista; this shop burnt down in 1979. In 1980, the Lyckebo factory buildings were sold and the company closed down.

Other industries in 20th century Storvreta included manufacture of cinema furnishings, two smithies delivering tools and other metal products to the furniture makers and farmers in the area, a dairy and a brewery. A fur farm breeding minks and silver foxes existed outside Storvreta until 1957.

A mill, Ekeby kvarn, is located just outside the village, on the river Fyris. There has been a mill in Ekeby since the 13th century; the current mill building was built in 1791. The property belongs to Uppsala University, which received the mill as a bequest from Queen Kristina in 1639, and then leased it out to millers. The last miller, Evert Edlund, leased Ekeby kvarn from 1950 until his retirement in 1987. In addition, there was a sawmill in Ekeby, which served both the farmers and the furniture industry. The sawmill was demolished in the 1960s.

== Today ==
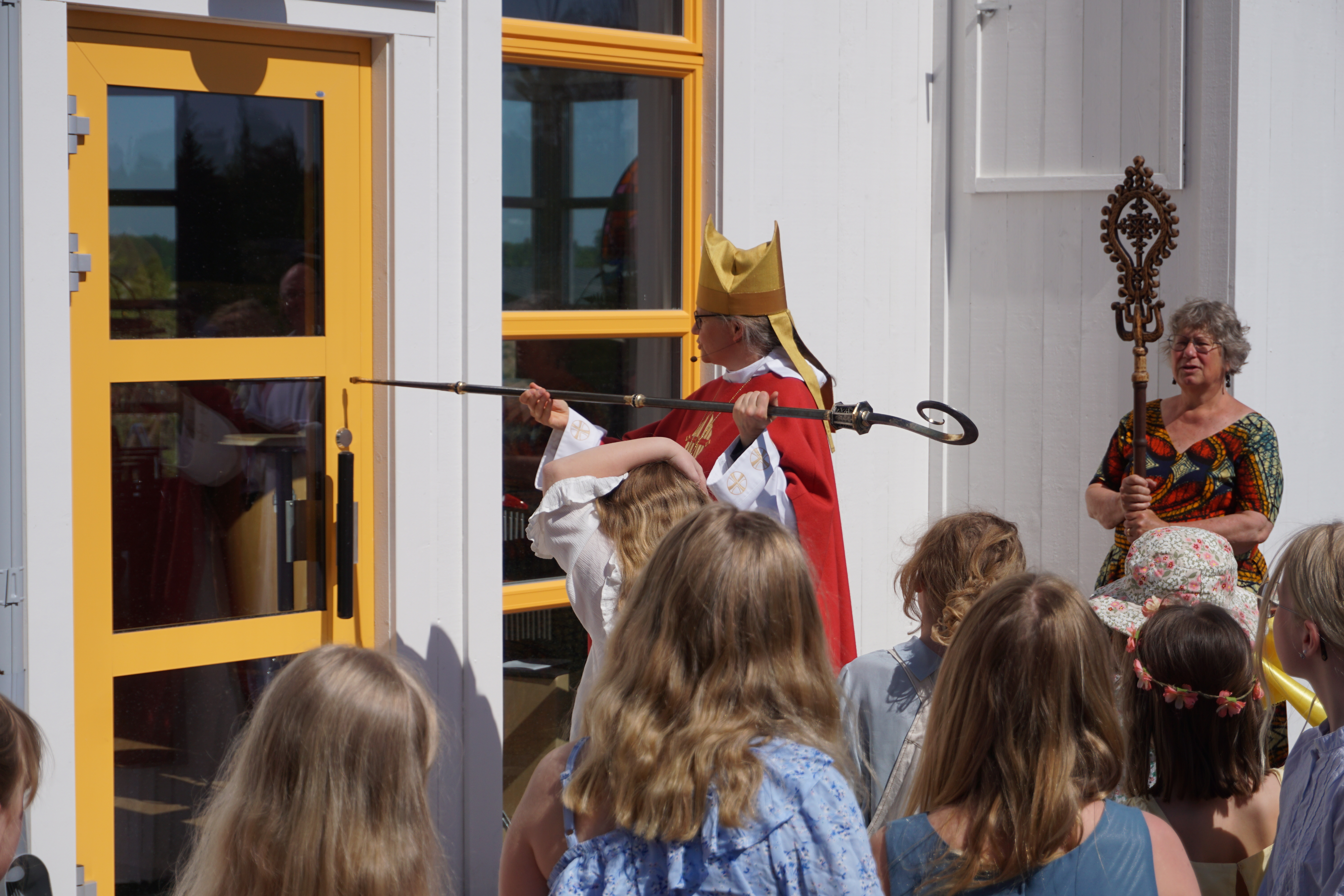
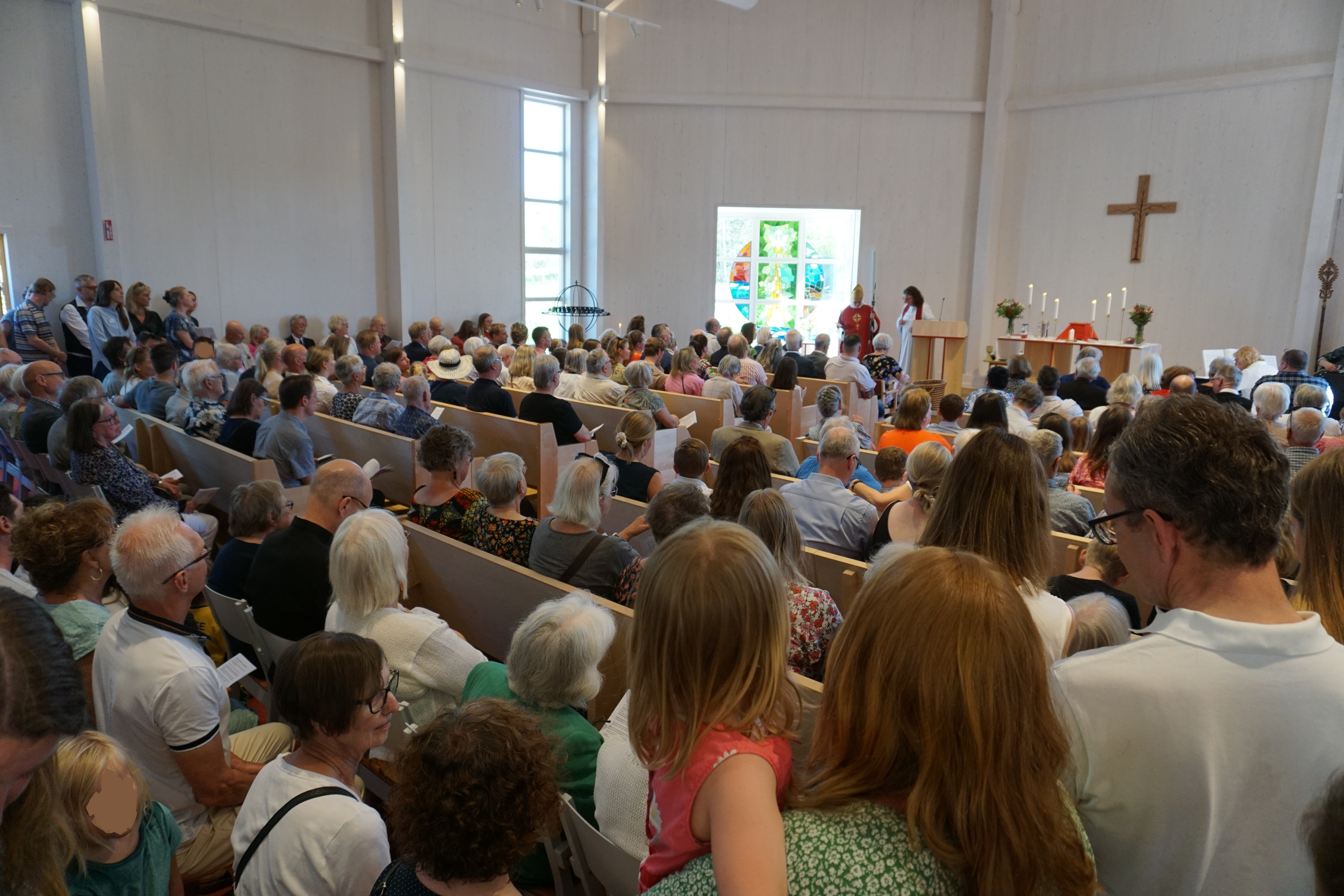
The dedication of Storvreta Evangelical-Lutheran Church by Bishop Karin Johannesson, the Bishop of Uppsala of the Church of Sweden, on Pentecost Day 2024.

Since 1971, Storvreta is part of Uppsala municipality, and today, a large proportion of the inhabitants work in Uppsala or Stockholm. There are frequent bus and train services to Uppsala, and the Upptåget train which has a stop in Storvreta also has services to Tierp and Gävle.

There are three primary schools in Storvreta: two lower primary schools, Storvretaskolan, and Pluggparadiset, and one upper primary school (grades 7–9), Ärentunaskolan. Ärentunaskolan burnt down in 1986, a fire which also destroyed the public library which was housed in the school. In 1989, the new school building opened, and Ärentunaskolan currently has about 500 students from Storvreta, Vattholma and Skyttorp.

Storvreta also has several shops and restaurants and a library, which opened in a new building a few years after the fire.

Storvreta IBK, the local floorball club is one of the largest in Sweden, with teams for children from the age of 6 and up, as well as a men's team which is four times winner of the Swedish Super League, Sweden's highest floorball league.

Storvreta belongs to Ärentuna Parish in the Church of Sweden. The 14th-century Ärentuna Church is located some 5 km to the west of Storvreta, and there is also a chapel in the village itself. In addition, there is an ecumenical church, Lyckebokyrkan, which belongs to the Uniting Church in Sweden (formerly the Mission Covenant Church of Sweden and the Baptist Union of Sweden), and which was built in 1982. When Lyckebokyrkan had been built, the old Mission Covenant Church, commissioned to be built by J E Blomqvist in 1908, was torn down. The old Baptist chapel from 1895 was also levelled at this time.

== Notable people from Storvreta ==
- Stefan Michnik
- Carola Häggkvist
- Alexia Danielsson
