= Ulleråker Hundred =

Coordinates: 59°51′N 17°26′E

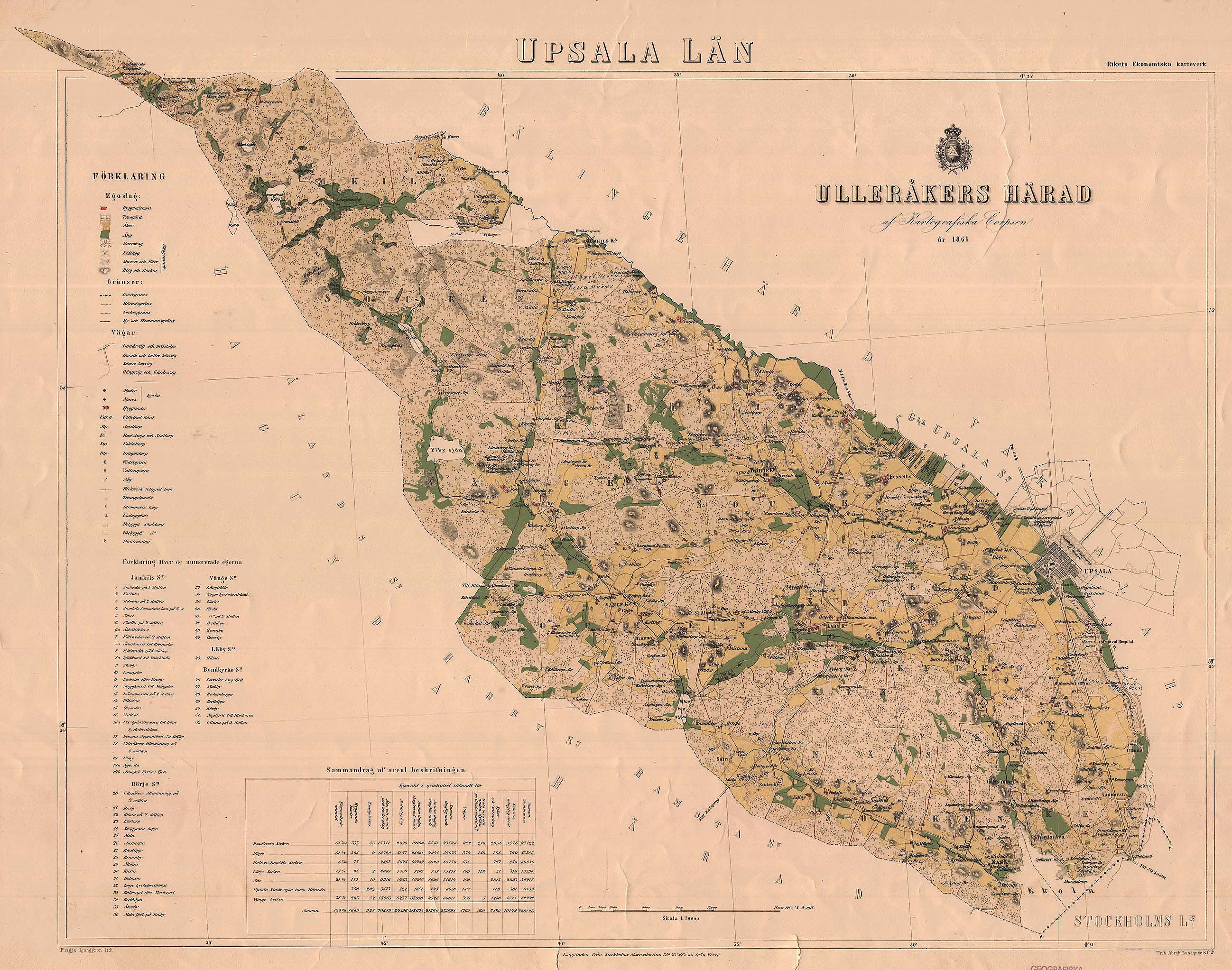
Ulleråker 1861

Ulleråker Hundred, or Ulleråkers härad, was a hundred of Uppland and Uppsala County in Sweden.

The area of the hundred stretches from the border of Hagunda hundred in the south-west to the Rivers Jumkilsån and Fyrisån in the northwest and Lake Ekoln in the south-east. The area of the hundred was described by Wilhelm Tham in 1850 as consisting of mostly unforested fields with occasional swampy areas around the streams which flow into the Fyris or Lake Ekoln.

The medieval Ullarakers hundare (the name later changed into Ulleråker) had its name after Ullaraker, the place of the thing, which was close to the Church of the Holy Trinity or the Castle in Uppsala. The hundred consisted of the parishes of Bondkyrka, Börje, Jumkil, Läby, Näs and Vänge.

The hundred was (1920) part of the middle court district of Uppsala County, Tiunda tingslag and Tiunda bailiwick. In the 19th and early 20th centuries it consisted of the parishes of Bondkyrka, Börje, Uppsala-Näs, Vänge, Läby, and one half of Jumkil, of which the other half belonged to Bälinge Hundred.

The antiquities in Ulleråker Hundred were described by the antiquarian Johan Peringskiöld in his large, illustrated work Monumenta ullerakeriensia, published in 1719.

Ulleråker is also the name of a deanery in the Archdiocese of Uppsala.

== The name ==
The name is first recorded in Old Norse literature as Ullarakr (the late twelfth century in the case of Krákumál, and 1225 in the case of Heimskringla). In Sweden, where written sources appear much later than on Iceland, the first appearance is in 1298 as Vllarakir. The first element is the genitive case of the name of the Norse god Ullr. The last element is åker m "field, acre".
