= Uppland Runic Inscription 948 =

Lailai

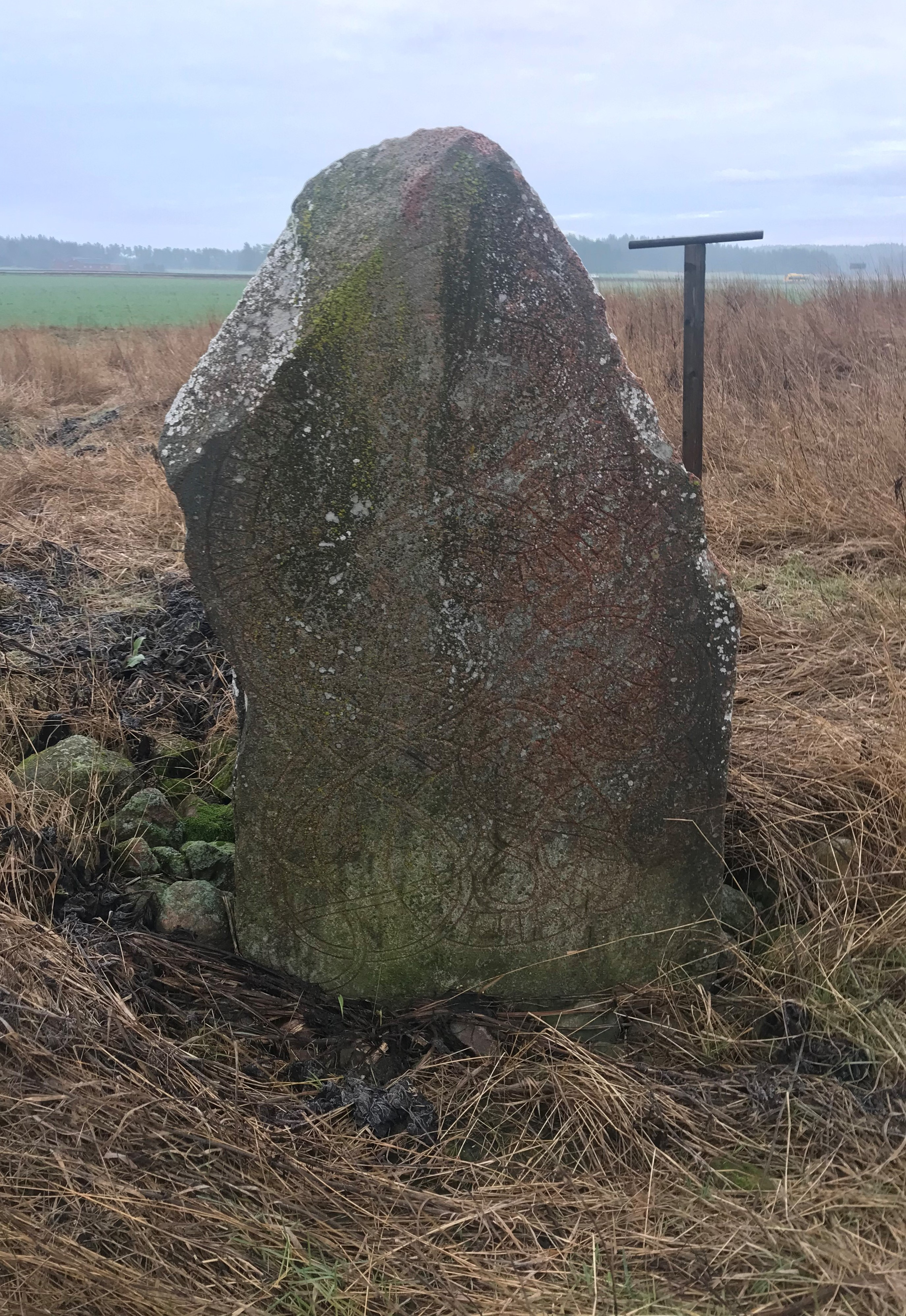
U 948

The Uppland Runic Inscription 948 is a Viking Age runestone engraved in Old Norse with the Younger Futhark runic alphabet. It is in reddish grey granite and is located at the Fålebro bridge, sunk into the ground, near Danmark Church in Uppsala Municipality. The style is Pr4.

== Inscription ==
' stʀþinkr × lit resa stin × iftʀ × arna × sun × sen × han × fyr × hayrt × lant × þelfi ' auk ' aurikia ' iuku ' runar ' iftʀ ' bruþur ' sin
{} Styðingʀ/Støðingʀ {} let ræisa stæin {} æftiʀ {} Arna, {} sun {} sinn. {} Hann {} for {} hvart(?) {} land(?) {} Þialfi {} ok {} Orøkia {} hioggu {} runaʀ {} æftiʀ {} broður {} sinn.
"Styðingr/Stœðingr had the stone raised in memory of Árni, his son. He travelled to every land (?) Þjalfi and Órœkja cut the runes in memory of their brother."

== See also ==
- List of runestones
