= Åke Hök =

Swedish equestrian

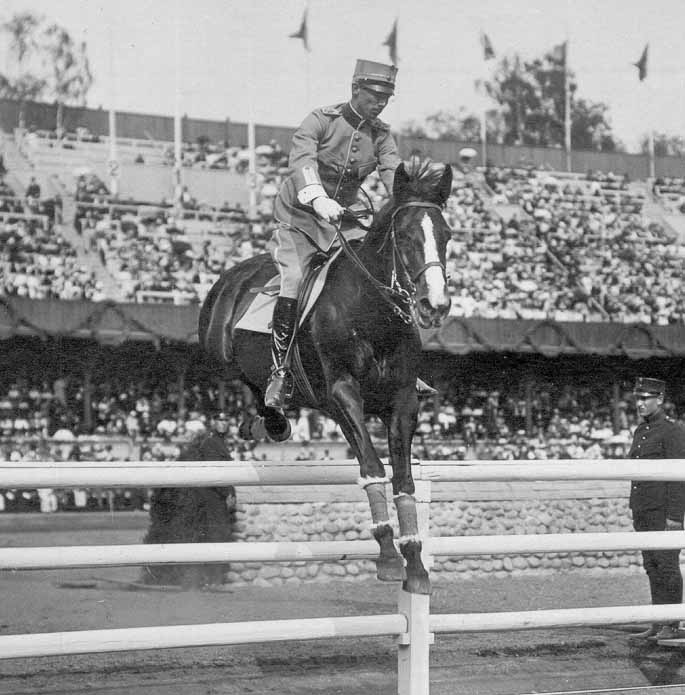
- Hök at the 1912 Olympics
- Born: Åke Karl Wilhelm Hök; 17 June 1889; Järlåsa, Sweden
- Died: 2 May 1963 (aged 73)
- Military career
- Allegiance: Sweden
- Branch: Swedish Army
- Service years: 1910–1949
- Rank: Colonel
- Commands: Scanian Cavalry Regiment (1937–42); Life Regiment Hussars (1942–46); Scanian Cavalry Regiment (1946–1949)

Åke Karl Wilhelm Hök (17 June 1889 – 2 May 1963) was a Swedish Army officer and horse rider. He competed in the 1912 Summer Olympics and finished 22nd in the individual jumping event on the horse Mona.

== Early life ==
Hök was born on 17 June 1889 in Järlåsa, Uppsala County, the son of lieutenant colonel Carl Hök and his wife Hilma Smitt. He passed mogenhetsexamen in Västerås in 1908.

== Career ==
Hök was commissioned as an officer in 1910 and was assigned as an underlöjtnant in the Scanian Dragoon Regiment where he was promoted to lieutenant in 1912. He attended the Royal Swedish Army Staff College from 1917 to 1919 and was captain of the General Staff in 1923. Hök served in the Military Office of the Land Defence and in the French Army in 1927. He became ryttmästare in the Life Regiment of Horse in 1928.

Hök served as an expert in the Ministry of Defence in 1928, 1931 and 1936. He was chief of staff of the Cavalry Inspectorate (Kavalleriinspektionen) from 1932 to 1935, and in 1933, he became major of the General Staff. Hök was promoted to lieutenant colonel and assigned to the Scanian Cavalry Regiment (Skånska kavalleriregementet) in 1936, where he became colonel and commanding officer in 1937. He was then appointed executive commander of the Life Regiment Hussars in 1942 and served as acting Inspector of the Local Defence within the III Military District from 1943 to 1944. Hök was commanding officer of the Scanian Cavalry Regiment from 1946.

== Personal life ==
In 1920, Hök married Hattie Pauli. They had three children: Hans (born 1921), Margareta (born 1926) and Lenore (born 1935).

== Dates of rank ==
- 1910 – Underlöjtnant
- 1912 – Lieutenant
- 1923 – Captain
- 1928 – Ryttmästare
- 1933 – Major
- 1936 – Lieutenant colonel
- 1937 – Colonel

== Awards and decaorations ==
Hök's awards:

=== Swedish ===
- (Sweden) Commander 1st Class of the Order of the Sword
- (Sweden) Knight of the Order of Vasa

=== Foreign ===
- Officer of the Order of the Crown of Italy
- (Latvia) Officer of the Order of the Three Stars
- (Belgium) Knight of the Order of Leopold
- Knight 1st Class of the Order of the White Rose of Finland
- (France) Knight of the Legion of Honour
- (Spain) Cross of Military Merit with White Decoration
