= Ytternäs och Vreta =

- Location within Uppsala Location within Sweden
- Coordinates: 59°46′30″N 17°36′15″E
- Country: Sweden
- Province: Uppland
- County: Uppsala County
- Municipality: Uppsala Municipality

Area
  - Total: 1.46 km^{2} (0.56 sq mi)

Population (31 December 2010)
  - Total: 636
  - Density: 436/km^{2} (1,130/sq mi)
- Time zone: UTC+1 (CET)
  - Summer (DST): UTC+2 (CEST)

Ytternäs och Vreta is a locality situated in Uppsala Municipality, Uppsala County, Sweden with 636 inhabitants in 2010.
