= Gåvsta =

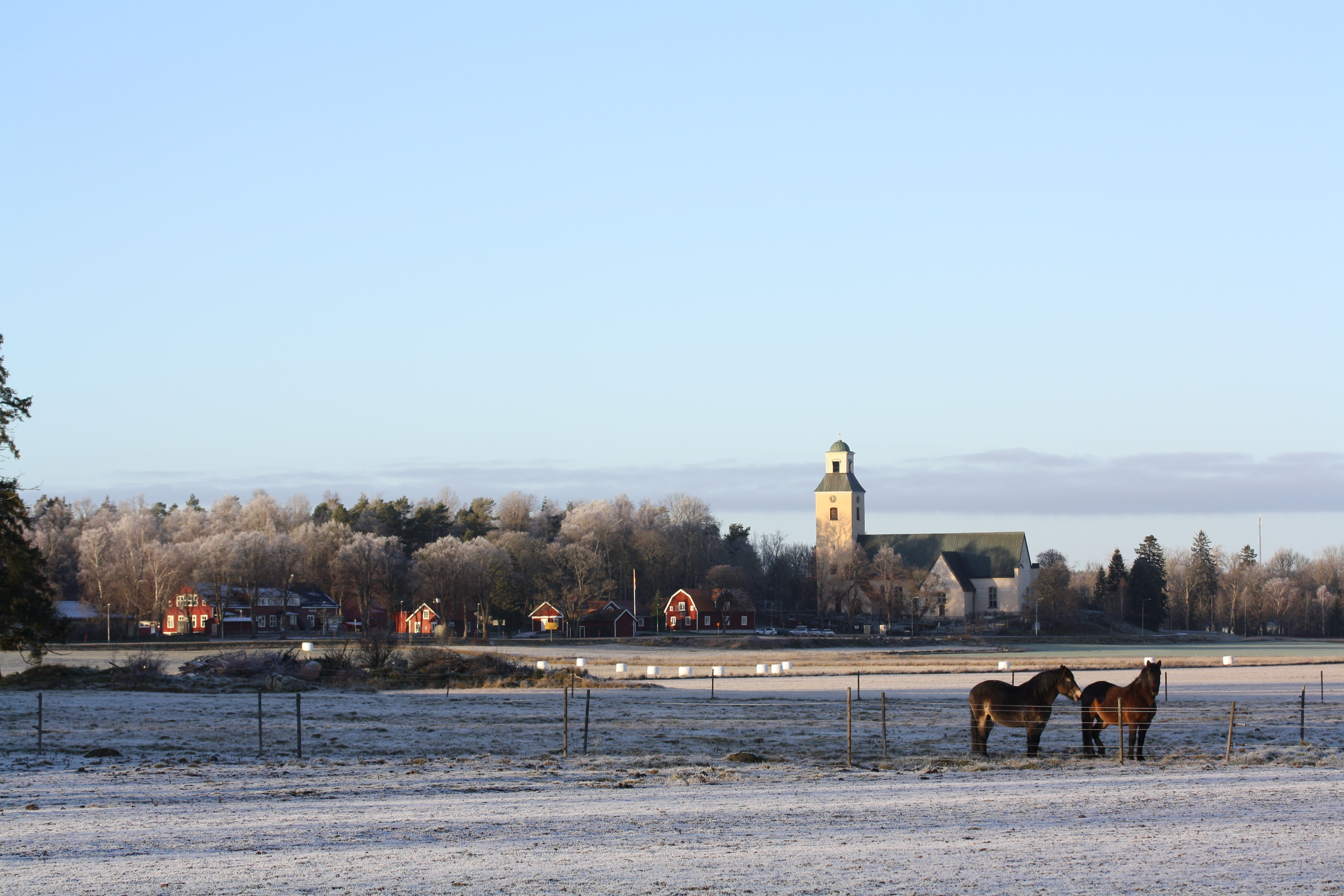
- Rasbo church and part of Gåvsta

- Location within Uppsala Location within Sweden
- Coordinates: 59°57′N 17°52′E
- Country: Sweden
- Province: Uppland
- County: Uppsala County
- Municipality: Uppsala Municipality

Area
  - Total: 0.44 km^{2} (0.17 sq mi)

Population (31 December 2020)
  - Total: 557
  - Density: 1,300/km^{2} (3,300/sq mi)
- Time zone: UTC+1 (CET)
  - Summer (DST): UTC+2 (CEST)

Gåvsta is a locality situated in Uppsala Municipality, Uppsala County, Sweden with 549 inhabitants in 2010.
