= Blackstalund =

- Location within Uppsala Location within Sweden
- Coordinates: 59°57′45″N 17°23′00″E
- Country: Sweden
- Province: Uppland
- County: Uppsala County
- Municipality: Uppsala Municipality

Area
  - Total: 0.65 km^{2} (0.25 sq mi)

Population (31 December 2020)
  - Total: 230
  - Density: 350/km^{2} (920/sq mi)
- Time zone: UTC+1 (CET)
  - Summer (DST): UTC+2 (CEST)

Blackstalund is a locality situated in Uppsala Municipality, Uppsala County, Sweden. It had 210 inhabitants in 2010.
