= Länna =

- Location within Uppsala Location within Sweden
- Coordinates: 59°52′N 17°58′E
- Country: Sweden
- Province: Uppland
- County: Uppsala County
- Municipality: Uppsala Municipality

Area
  - Total: 0.95 km^{2} (0.37 sq mi)

Population (31 December 2020)
  - Total: 670
  - Density: 710/km^{2} (1,800/sq mi)
- Time zone: UTC+1 (CET)
  - Summer (DST): UTC+2 (CEST)

Länna (old spelling Lenna) is a locality situated in Uppsala Municipality, Uppsala County, Sweden with 685 inhabitants in 2010.
