= Lövstalöt =

- Location within Uppsala Location within Sweden
- Coordinates: 59°57′N 17°35′E
- Country: Sweden
- Province: Uppland
- County: Uppsala County
- Municipality: Uppsala Municipality

Area
  - Total: 0.71 km^{2} (0.27 sq mi)

Population (31 December 2020)
  - Total: 1,445
  - Density: 2,000/km^{2} (5,300/sq mi)
- Time zone: UTC+1 (CET)
  - Summer (DST): UTC+2 (CEST)

Lövstalöt is a locality situated in Uppsala Municipality, Uppsala County, Sweden with 1,046 inhabitants in 2010.

Lövstalöt is situated 12 km north of the city of Uppsala, in the flat country that surrounds the city. Until the end of the 1930s, the village consisted of a few houses and a school, built in 1892. In 1938, a woodworking factory, Bälinge Snickerifabrik, was built.

Most of the houses in Lövstalöt were built during the 1960s and 1980s. Detached houses dominate, but there are also some terraced houses.

In the centre of Lövstalöt there is a gravefield from the Iron Age.
