= Skölsta =

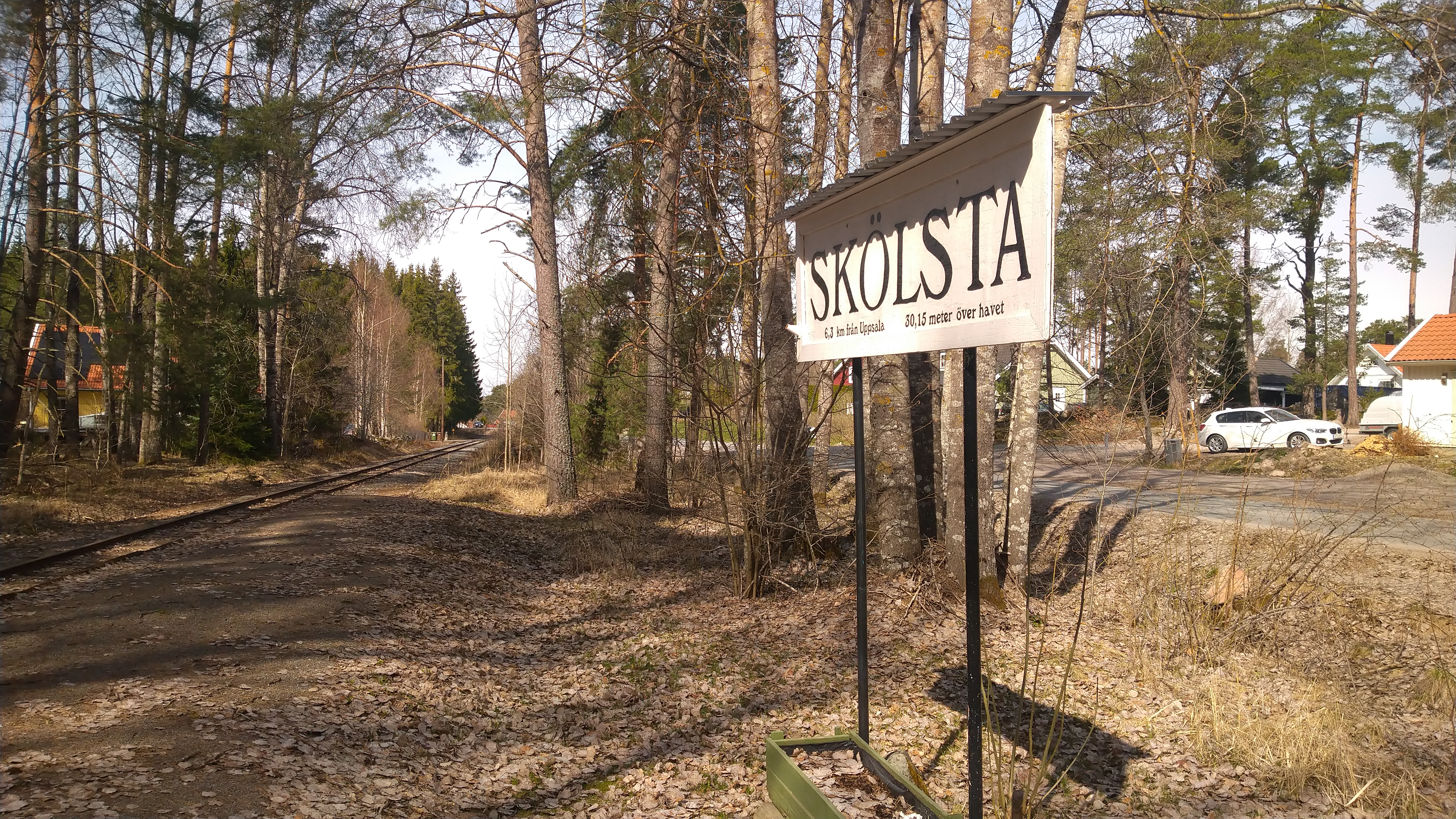
- Lennakatten's stop in Skölsta

- Location within Uppsala Location within Sweden
- Coordinates: 59°53′N 17°44′E
- Country: Sweden
- Province: Uppland
- County: Uppsala County
- Municipality: Uppsala Municipality

Area
  - Total: 0.39 km^{2} (0.15 sq mi)

Population (31 December 2020)
  - Total: 557
  - Density: 1,400/km^{2} (3,700/sq mi)
- Time zone: UTC+1 (CET)
  - Summer (DST): UTC+2 (CEST)

Skölsta is a locality situated in Uppsala Municipality, Uppsala County, Sweden with 627 inhabitants in 2021. The narrow-gauge heritage railroad Upsala-Lenna Jernväg has a stop in Skölsta, with a manual signal which passengers can use to signal the train to stop.
