= Sävja =

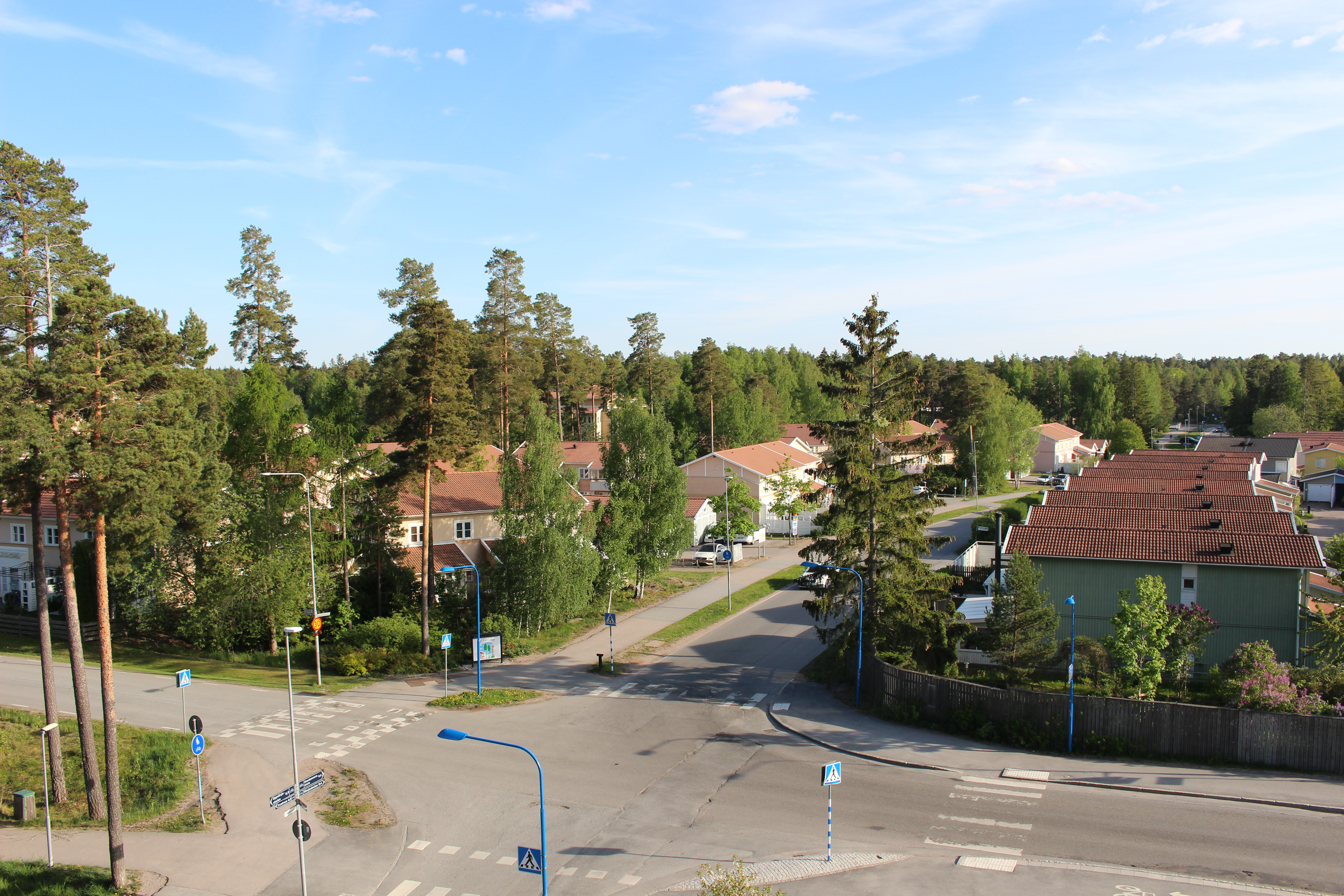

- Location within Uppsala Location within Sweden
- Coordinates: 59°49′N 17°42′E
- Country: Sweden
- Province: Uppland
- County: Uppsala County
- Municipality: Uppsala Municipality

Area
  - Total: 4.02 km^{2} (1.55 sq mi)

Population (31 December 2020)
  - Total: 9,814
  - Density: 2,440/km^{2} (6,320/sq mi)
- Time zone: UTC+1 (CET)
  - Summer (DST): UTC+2 (CEST)

Sävja is a suburb of Uppsala and a locality situated in Uppsala Municipality, Uppsala County, Sweden with 9,684 inhabitants in 2010.
