= Håga =

- Location within Uppsala Location within Sweden
- Coordinates: 59°51′N 17°35′E
- Country: Sweden
- Province: Uppland
- County: Uppsala County
- Municipality: Uppsala Municipality

Area
  - Total: 0.20 km^{2} (0.077 sq mi)

Population (31 December 2020)
  - Total: 310
  - Density: 1,500/km^{2} (4,000/sq mi)
- Time zone: UTC+1 (CET)
  - Summer (DST): UTC+2 (CEST)

Håga is a locality situated in Uppsala Municipality, Uppsala County, Sweden with 302 inhabitants in 2010.
