= Gunsta =

- Location within Uppsala Location within Sweden
- Coordinates: 59°51′N 17°50′E
- Country: Sweden
- Province: Uppland
- County: Uppsala County
- Municipality: Uppsala Municipality

Area
  - Total: 0.30 km^{2} (0.12 sq mi)

Population (31 December 2020)
  - Total: 618
  - Density: 2,100/km^{2} (5,300/sq mi)
- Time zone: UTC+1 (CET)
  - Summer (DST): UTC+2 (CEST)

Gunsta is a locality situated in Uppsala Municipality, Uppsala County, Sweden with 380 inhabitants in 2010.
