= Almunge =

- Location within Uppsala Location within Sweden
- Coordinates: 59°52′N 18°02′E
- Country: Sweden
- Province: Uppland
- County: Uppsala County
- Municipality: Uppsala Municipality

Area
  - Total: 0.85 km^{2} (0.33 sq mi)

Population (31 December 2020)
  - Total: 909
  - Density: 1,100/km^{2} (2,800/sq mi)
- Time zone: UTC+1 (CET)
  - Summer (DST): UTC+2 (CEST)

Almunge is a locality situated in Uppsala Municipality, Uppsala County, Sweden with 813 inhabitants in 2010. The narrow-gauge heritage railroad Upsala-Lenna Jernväg has a stop in Almunge.
