= The Uppsala River Rafting Event =

Annual event in Uppsala, Sweden

Coordinates: 59.8640°N 17.6304°E

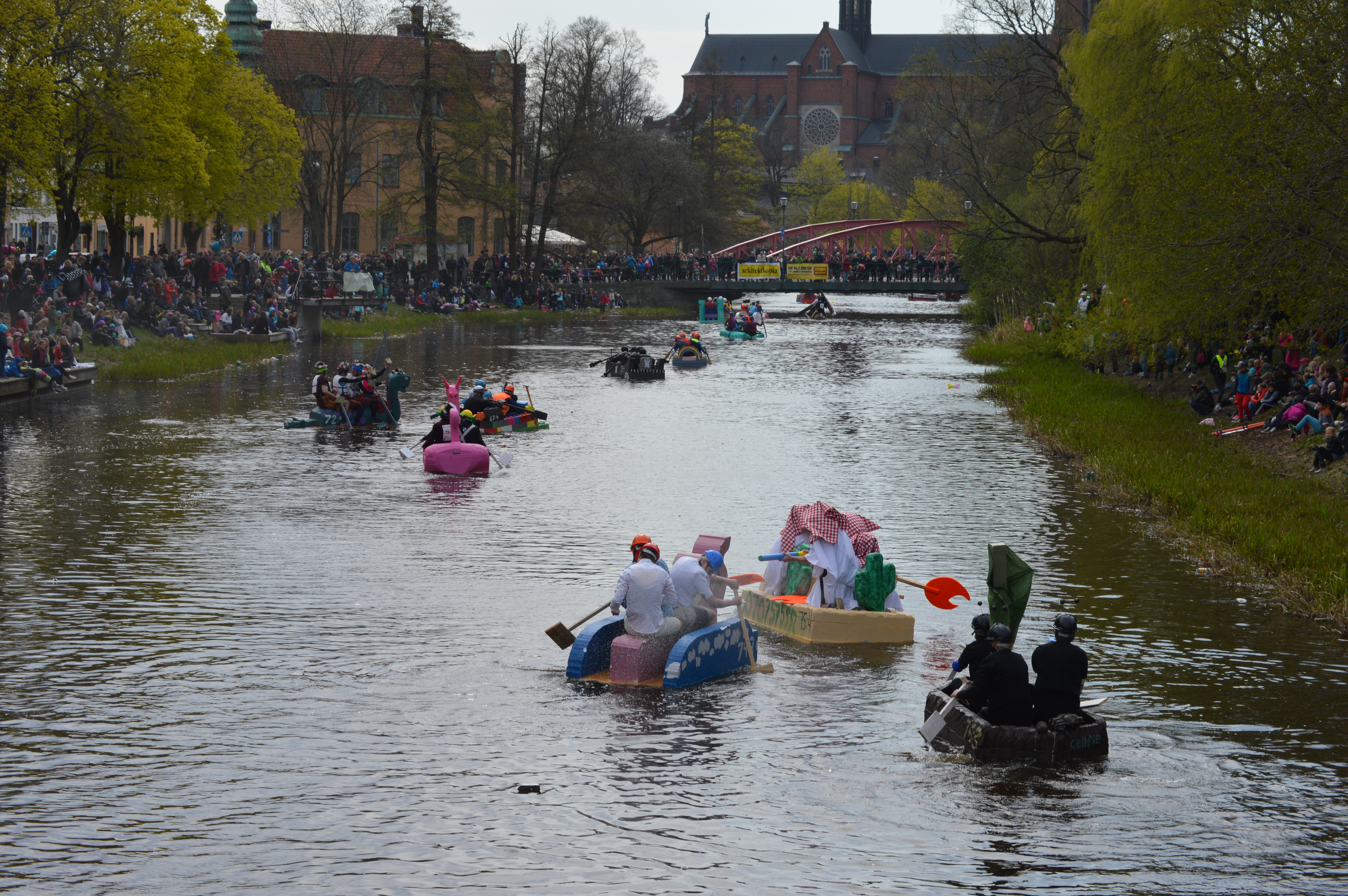
The event in 2015.

The Uppsala River Rafting Event is an event organized in Uppsala, Sweden on the Fyris River at the end of April each year.

Started in 1975 by the students Anders Ahnesjö and Carl-Johan Hansson, the event is organized by the Uppsala Union of Engineering and Science Students (UTN).

== The River Rafting ==
The rafting takes place on 30 April every year, Walpurgis Night. Normally about 100 participants float the Haglund bridge in Uppsala to Islandsfallet in home-built polystyrene rafts. Tens of thousands of specatators watch the event. The prizes are awarded by the principal of the university, the Rector Magnificus.

A few of the rafts represent different organizations but the vast majority of the participants are students at the University of Uppsala or other universities.

== The River Festival ==
The River Festival, which takes place during the preceding week, allows participants to build their rafts in the raft-construction area. During the daytime, there are a number of activities and in the evenings different themed pubs, parties and performances. The night before the rafting event is known as Kvalborg (qualifying night).

== The Rafting committee ==
The Rafting committee organizes both the River Rafting and the Rafting Festival. The committee is selected once a year and consists of 23 volunteers who are students at the Department of Engineering and Science. The members of the committee are recognisable by their red tops and black carpenter's trousers with flames licking up their legs.
