= Skyttorp =

- Location within Uppsala Location within Sweden
- Coordinates: 60°04′47″N 17°44′14″E
- Country: Sweden
- Province: Uppland
- County: Uppsala County
- Municipality: Uppsala Municipality

Area
  - Total: 0.88 km^{2} (0.34 sq mi)

Population (31 December 2020)
  - Total: 641
  - Density: 730/km^{2} (1,900/sq mi)
- Time zone: UTC+1 (CET)
  - Summer (DST): UTC+2 (CEST)

Skyttorp is a locality situated in Uppsala Municipality, Uppsala County, Sweden with 632 inhabitants in 2018.

== Transportation ==
Skyttorp is part of the Upptåget-traffic between Gävle northward and Uppsala southward. Travel time is 17 minutes to Uppsala and 53 minutes to Gävle.

There is also UL-buss 823 connecting Skyttorp with Österbybruk and Uppsala.

== Demographics ==
Historical population in Skyttorp from 1950 to 2018
City	Population
1950	349
1960	336
1965	384
1970	467
1975	500
1980	483
1990	554
1995	652
2000	631
2005	664
2010	666
2015	636
2018	632
