= Läby =

- Location within Uppsala Location within Sweden
- Coordinates: 60°05′N 17°33′E
- Country: Sweden
- Province: Uppland
- County: Uppsala County
- Municipality: Uppsala Municipality

Area
  - Total: 0.30 km^{2} (0.12 sq mi)

Population (31 December 2020)
  - Total: 227
  - Density: 760/km^{2} (2,000/sq mi)
- Time zone: UTC+1 (CET)
  - Summer (DST): UTC+2 (CEST)

Läby is a locality situated in Uppsala Municipality, Uppsala County, Sweden with 220 inhabitants in 2010.
