= Ekoln =

Northernmost gulf of Lake Mälaren, Sweden

Coordinates: 59°45′N 17°37′E

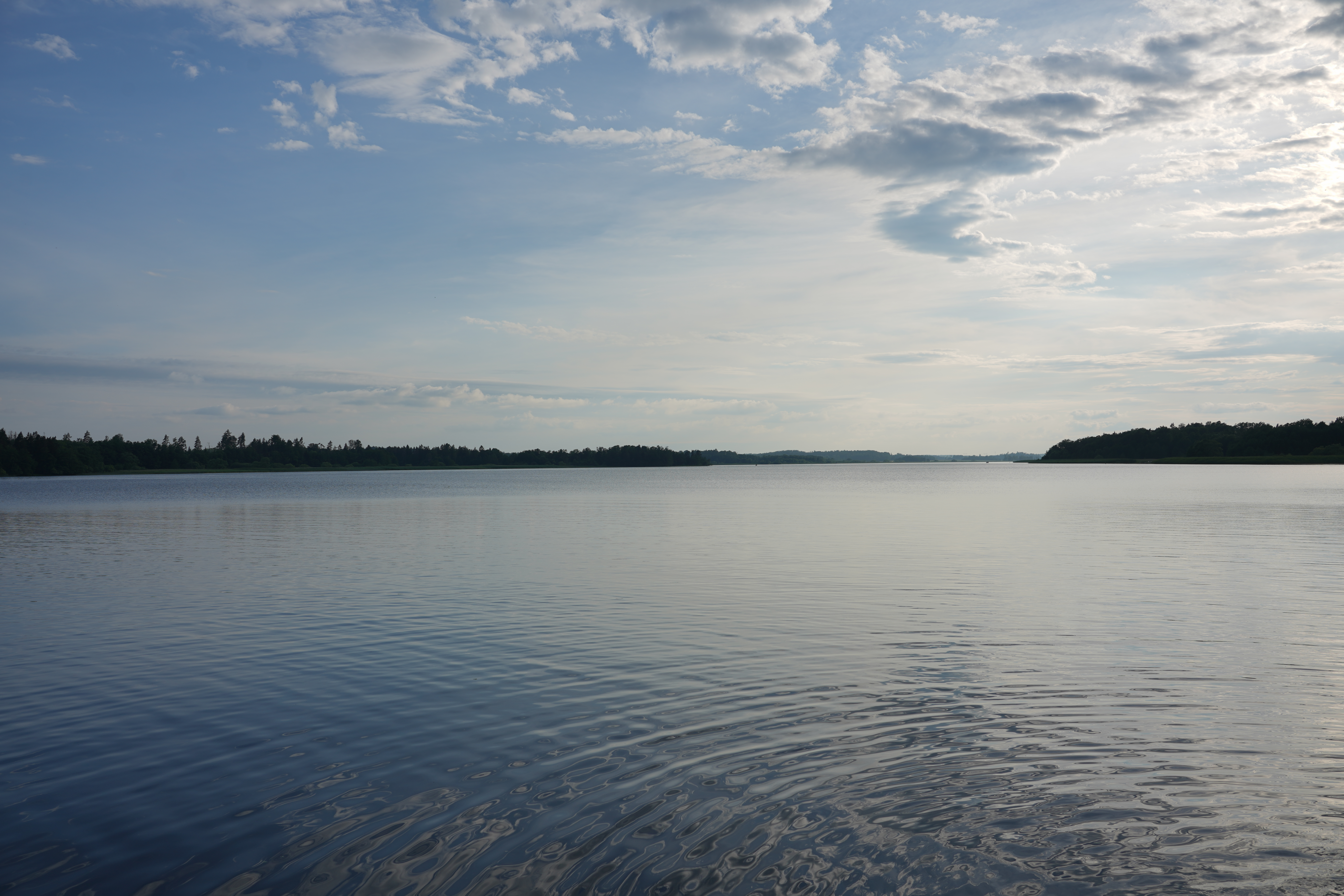
Ekoln at Wik Castle.

Ekoln constitutes the northernmost gulf of Lake Mälaren, Sweden. On its northern shore are the southern suburbs of Uppsala and the mouth of River Fyris.

In 2019, Ikea named a bathroom accessory series after it.
