= Vårdsätra =

- Location within Uppsala Location within Sweden
- Coordinates: 59°48′N 17°37′E
- Country: Sweden
- Province: Uppland
- County: Uppsala County
- Municipality: Uppsala Municipality

Area
  - Total: 0.28 km^{2} (0.11 sq mi)

Population (31 December 2010)
  - Total: 237
  - Density: 834/km^{2} (2,160/sq mi)
- Time zone: UTC+1 (CET)
  - Summer (DST): UTC+2 (CEST)

Vårdsätra is a locality situated in Uppsala Municipality, Uppsala County, Sweden with 237 inhabitants in 2010.
