= Region Uppsala =

Regional council of Uppsala County, Sweden

Coordinates: 59°51′36″N 17°38′46″E

- Regional Council
- Formation: 2017
- County: Uppsala County
- Country: Sweden
- Website: www.regionuppsala.se

Legislative branch
- Legislature: Regional Council
- Assembly members: 101

Executive branch
- Chair of the Regional Executive Board: Helena Proos
- Headquarters: Uppsala

Region Uppsala is the regional council for Uppsala County, primarily responsible for healthcare services and public transport in the county, as well as regional development and cultural activities.

== History ==
Uppsala County

The organisation was previously known as the County Council of Uppsala County (Landstinget i Uppsala län) until 31 December 2016. The current structure was established on 1 January 2017 through a merger between the county council and the Uppsala County Regional Association (Regionförbundet i Uppsala län). The headquarters is located in Regionens Hus on Storgatan in central Uppsala.

On 5 May 2015, the regional leadership presented plans to transform the county council into a region, merging it with the Uppsala County Regional Association. The proposal received broad support and was approved, allowing the new region to be established on 1 January 2017.

== Responsibilities ==
=== Hospitals ===
Region Uppsala operates Uppsala University Hospital (Akademiska sjukhuset) in Uppsala and Enköping Hospital (Lasarettet i Enköping). Uppsala University Hospital is one of two university hospitals in the Central Sweden Healthcare Region, treating patients from beyond Uppsala County.

=== Public Transport ===
The Traffic and Society division within Region Uppsala functions as the regional public transport authority. It is responsible for planning, procuring, and developing public transport in Uppsala County. Services are operated under the brand UL. The region also owns the public transport company Gamla Uppsala Buss.

=== Education and Culture ===
Region Uppsala operates Wiks folkhögskola (Wik Folk High School), Upplandsmuseet (Uppland Museum), and the regional music foundation Musik i Uppland.

== Organisation and politics ==
Region Uppsala is a politically governed organisation, with the Regional Council as its highest decision-making body. The Regional Executive Committee is responsible for implementing policies and preparing matters for the council.

For the 2022–2026 term, Region Uppsala was initially governed by a coalition of the Moderate Party, Christian Democrats, Centre Party, and Liberals. The Chair of the Regional Executive Committee was Emilie Orring of the Moderate Party.

As of 14 February 2024, Region Uppsala is governed by a majority coalition consisting of the Social Democrats, Left Party, Centre Party, and Green Party. The Chair of the Regional Executive Committee is Helena Proos from the Social Democrats.

== See also ==
- Uppsala County
