= Vattholma =

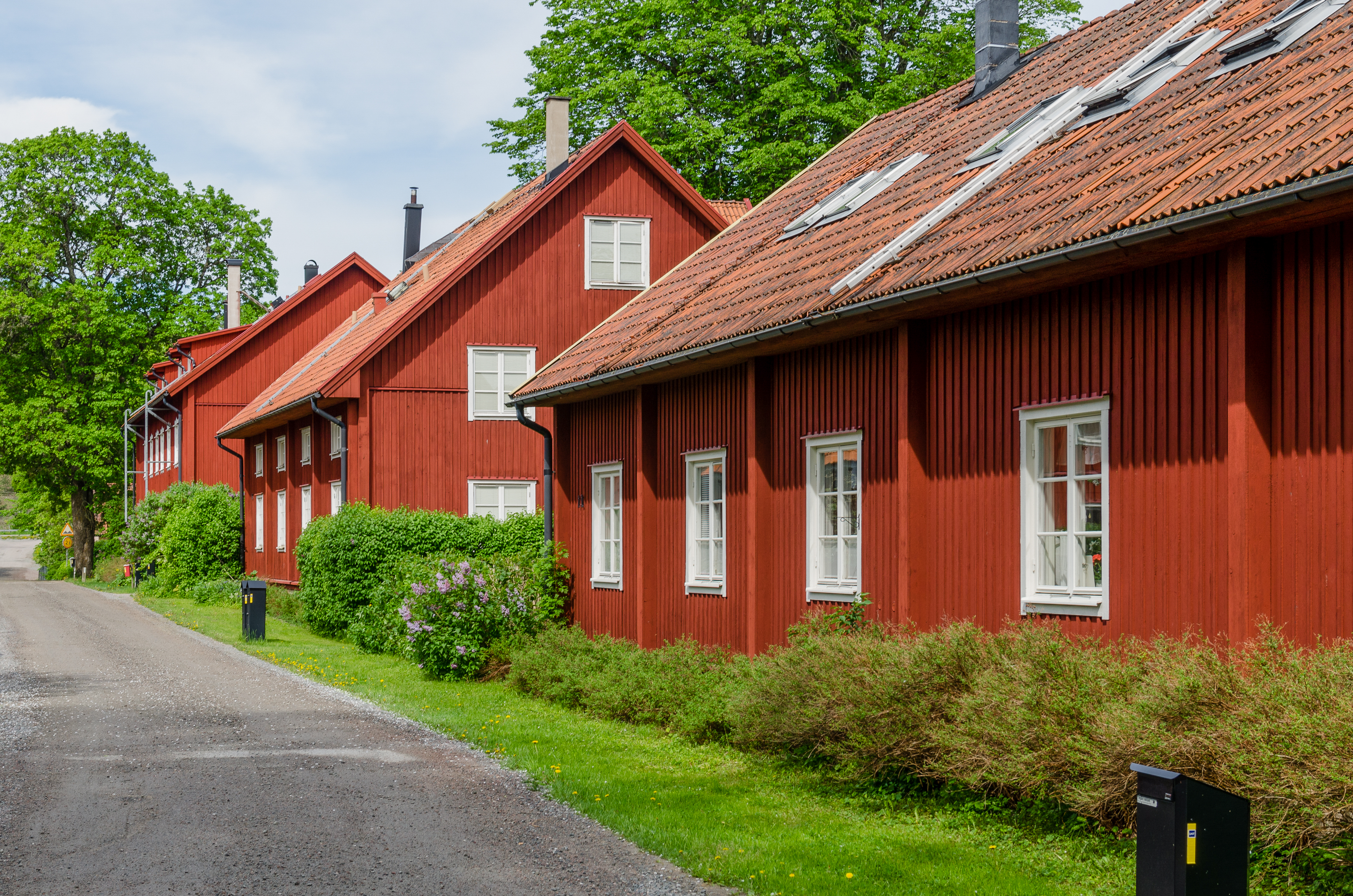

- Location within Uppsala Location within Sweden
- Coordinates: 60°01′N 17°44′E
- Country: Sweden
- Province: Uppland
- County: Uppsala County
- Municipality: Uppsala Municipality

Area
  - Total: 1.16 km^{2} (0.45 sq mi)

Population (31 December 2020)
  - Total: 1,392
  - Density: 1,200/km^{2} (3,110/sq mi)
- Time zone: UTC+1 (CET)
  - Summer (DST): UTC+2 (CEST)

Vattholma is a locality situated in Uppsala Municipality, Uppsala County, Sweden with 1,427 inhabitants in 2010.
