= Järlåsa =

- Location within Uppsala Location within Sweden
- Coordinates: 59°53′N 17°12′E
- Country: Sweden
- Province: Uppland
- County: Uppsala County
- Municipality: Uppsala Municipality

Area
  - Total: 0.76 km^{2} (0.29 sq mi)

Population (31 December 2020)
  - Total: 577
  - Density: 870/km^{2} (2,300/sq mi)
- Time zone: UTC+1 (CET)
  - Summer (DST): UTC+2 (CEST)

Järlåsa is a locality situated in Uppsala Municipality, Uppsala County, Sweden with 577 inhabitants in 2020.
