= Gottsunda =

Coordinates: 59°48′35″N 17°37′40″E

Gottsunda, Uppsala
- District of Uppsala
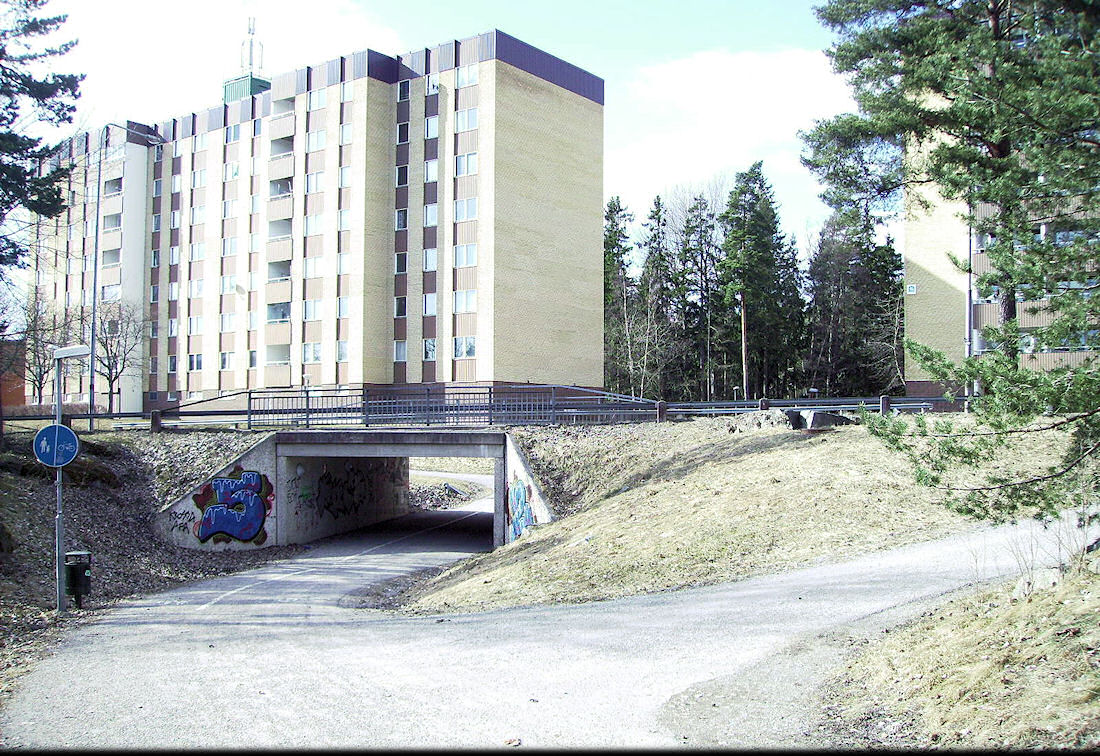
- Musikvägen road/walking trail crossing, Gottsunda
- Interactive map of Gottsunda, Uppsala
- Country: Sweden
- City: Uppsala

Gottsunda, is a district in Uppsala, Sweden. In 2007, it had 9,474 inhabitants. The majority of the buildings are high-rise buildings built as part of the Million Programme in the 1960s and 1970s.

== Etymology ==
The name is derived from the farm Gottsunda, and Gutasund or Guttasund is mentioned in sources as far back as 1304. The Swedish botanist Carl von Linné is known to have made excursions to Gottsunda with his students during the 18th century.

== History ==
=== 2000s ===
In the period leading up to 2009, there were a continuous increase in the number of crimes reported to police. After an arrest rioters started throwing rocks at police and setting fire to cars and car tires. The police started a collaboration with the school and social services in the area, and during the following three years, the number of crimes decreased by 33%.

=== 2010s ===
In the latter half of the 2010s, there were several incidents involving shootings and cars being set on fire and in its 2017 report, the Swedish Police Authority placed the district in the most severe category of urban areas with high crime rates. Regional chief of police Carin Götblad stated that the classification was due to having a number of criminal gangs, many illegal weapons in circulation and families where a criminal lifestyle is inherited from generation to generation.

In 2017, police registered 2,800 incident reports in the district, which was an increase of 17% on the previous year. An incident is defined as anything from a violent crime to vandalism such as a broken window.

== See also ==
- Gottsunda Parish
