= Graneberg =

Coordinates: 59°47′30″N 17°39′10″E

Graneberg is a suburban part of the city of Uppsala, by Lake Ekoln, a branch of Lake Mälaren. Granebergsparken (Graneberg park) lies within the neighborhood. Graneberg is the site of the cities port and docks at Skarholmen.
