= Holy Trinity Church, Uppsala =

Medieval church building in Uppsala, Sweden

Holy Trinity Church
- The Peasants Church (Swedish: Bondkyrkan)
- Swedish: Helga Trefaldighets kyrka
- The church building with the towers of Uppsala Cathedral seen in the background
- Holy Trinity Church
- 59°51′24.8″N 17°37′57.4″E
- Address: Nathan Söderbloms plan, Odinslund, Uppsala
- Country: Sweden
- Denomination: Church of Sweden

Architecture
- Architectural type: Parish church
- Style: Brick Gothic
- Completed: 14th Century

Specifications
- Materials: Stone and brick

Administration
- Archdiocese: Archdiocese of Uppsala
- Parish: Holy Trinity Parish

Holy Trinity Church (Swedish: Helga Trefaldighets kyrka), also formerly known as The Peasant Church (Swedish: Bondkyrkan), is a historic church building in Uppsala, Sweden. Located within the Archdiocese of Uppsala, it is the main church of Holy Trinity Parish.

A building for worship has stood on the site since the late 13th century. It was first constructed of wood then later rebuilt with stone and brick, although both buildings were predated by an older Holy Trinity Church which likely stood just to the north, at a site under Uppsala Cathedral.

== History ==
=== Predecessor ===
Early writings include references to a Holy Trinity Church in Östra Aros (as Uppsala was then known) that would predate the current church building, however the reliability of these sources are the subject of debate.

The legend of Sweden's Saint Erik states that in 1160, the king attended Mass to commemorate the Feast of the Ascension inside Holy Trinity Church at Östra Aros. While the service was ongoing, he received word that an army led by his enemy Magnus Henriksson was approaching, however, determined to hear Mass to its conclusion, he remained in the building. Following the service, King Erik was captured, beaten, and beheaded. The legend records that this early Holy Trinity Church was located on the hill where Uppsala Cathedral now stands. It is the belief of Uppsala antiquarian Nils Sundquist, that a royal estate or castle had once stood on the hill, with Holy Trinity serving as its church.

In 1273, the archiepiscopal seat was moved from its original location in Gamla Uppsala to Östra Aros, which was renamed Uppsala. This resulted in the construction of Uppsala Cathedral, which according to tradition, was built on the site of Holy Trinity Church. The church would have been temporarily used as a cathedral by the archbishopric while the new cathedral was constructed around it. For many years, no physical evidence of a former building under the cathedral could be found, including during an excavation of the cathedral floor as part of the building's restoration in the 1970s. However, in 2005, a ground-penetrating radar (GPR) investigation revealed traces of a building beneath the cathedral's floor. This GPR work likely confirmed the historicity of a predecessor Holy Trinity Church building that once stood on the site of the cathedral.

=== Construction ===
After the archbishopric took over the original church in the 1270s, the parish quickly built a wooden replacement 330 feet (100 m) to the south. This remains the site of Holy Trinity Church into the present day.

Southeast corner of the church, showing the sacristy, believed to be the oldest extant part of the church

Archeological excavations have revealed that the church's present sacristy was probably built against the side of the wooden church and survived when the wooden church was rebuilt in stone and brick, starting around the year 1300. The tower was built in 1399, while its height was increased in the 1400s. The transepts were also added in the 15th century, both of which contain chapels.

=== Later history ===
Shortly after 1800, several medieval furnishings in the church were replaced, including objects in the chancel, the altar, and the pulpit.

The name Bondkyrka (Peasant Church) was used up until 1947 and probably indicated the church was a rural parish church, unlike the city parishes within central Uppsala.

== Architecture ==
The present church contains a nave built in the basilica architectural form. Both the foundations and lower nave walls are constructed of stone, while the upper portions of the nave, along with the tower, transepts, pillars, vaults and other features are built of brick.

Interior of Holy Trinity Church

The sacristy is built along the south wall of the church and includes a cellar, unusual for medieval buildings. Also unusual is the north-facing porch, rather than a south-facing portal as is common in the region. A tower sits at the west end and two transepts intersect the church. Entrance portals are located in the tower and north porch. Above the church's three aisles are vaulted ceilings and the central aisle includes round clerestory windows. At the west end, against the tower, is a six-lobed tracery rose window.

The vaults contain paintings and floral decoration. The original 15th-century vault paintings had at one time been whitewashed and were restored by church decorator Edvard Bergh from 1904–1905, however significant portions were so badly damaged over the centuries (especially in the nave's central aisle) that parts of Bergh's work may be considered more a 20th-century interpretation than a true restoration. 15th-century paintings by Albertus Pictor are visible elsewhere in the church.

The church prior to being damaged by fire in 1702, published in Johan Peringskiöld's Monumenta Ullerakerensia cum Upsalla Nova illustrata (1719)

At one time the tower featured a tall medieval spire, however after the church was damaged in the Great Uppsala Fire of 1702, a low roof replaced the spire. Within the tower are two bells, both cast following the fire.

== Churchyard ==
A burial ground surrounding the church had existed since the wooden church was constructed and the building of foundations for the stone and brick church disturbed some graves. The cemetery's exact boundaries remain elusive, but it is known that a stone wall once surrounded the churchyard. In 1803, the decision was made to close the burial ground in favor of Uppsala Old Cemetery. Between 1832–1833 the wall was removed, with the stone sold and the old cemetery was leveled.

== Bibliography ==
- Gunilla, Malm (1987). "Helga Trefaldighets kyrka i Uppsala" [Holy Trinity Church in Uppsala] (PDF). Uppland: Årsbok för medlemmarna i Upplands Fornminnesförening och Hembygdsförbund (in Swedish). 1985–86. Upplands Fornminnesförenings Förlag: 7–24. ISBN 91-85618-25-X. ISSN 0566-3059.
