= Uppsala Municipality =

Uppsala Municipality Uppsala kommun
- Municipality
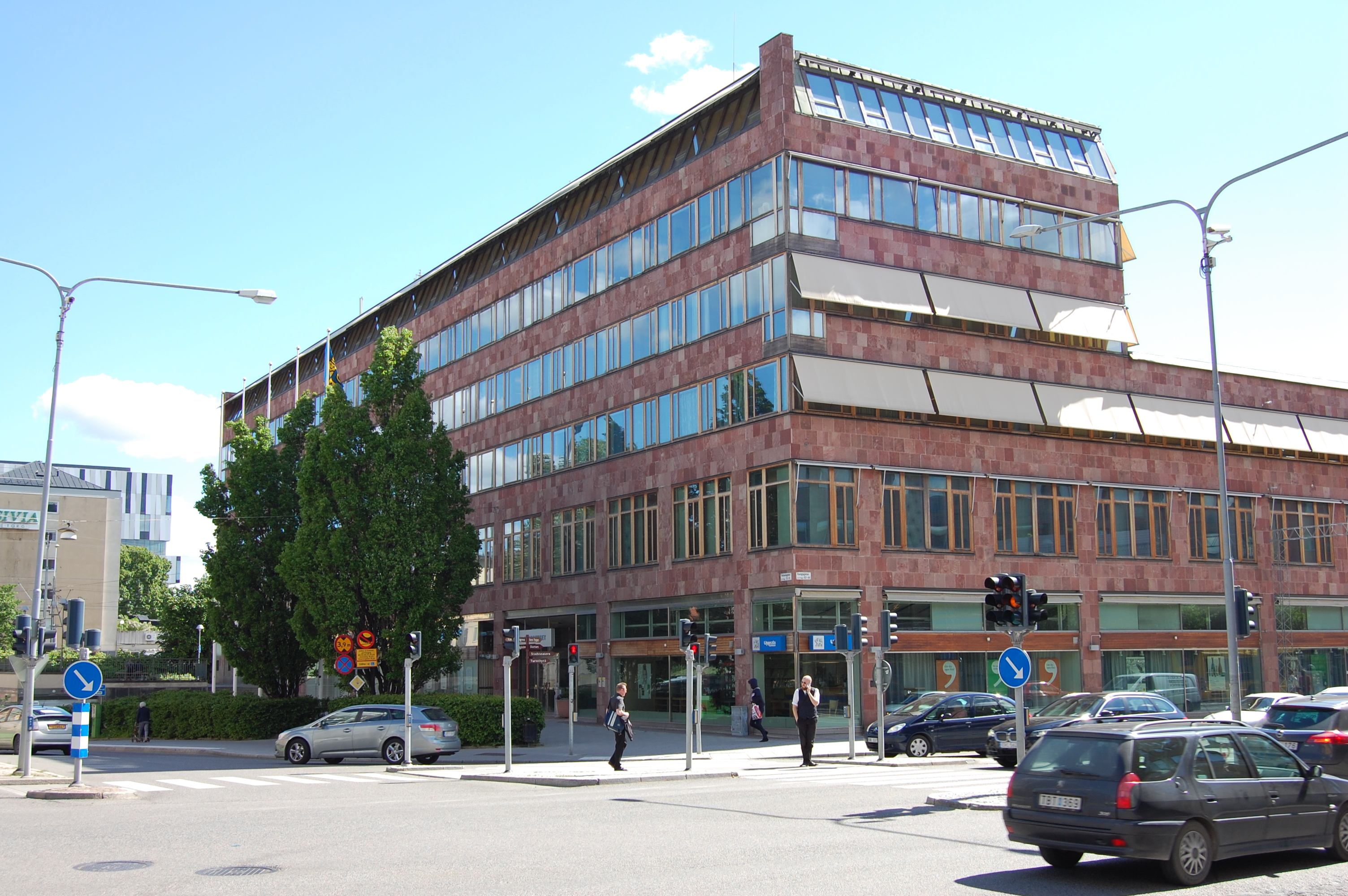
- Uppsala City Hall

- Coat of arms

- Coordinates: 59°52′N 17°38′E
- Country: Sweden
- County: Uppsala County
- Seat: Uppsala

Area
  - Total: 2,234.47 km^{2} (862.73 sq mi)
  - Land: 2,182.8 km^{2} (842.8 sq mi)
  - Water: 51.67 km^{2} (19.95 sq mi)
- Area as of 1 January 2014.

Population (30 June 2025)
  - Total: 247,269
  - Density: 113.28/km^{2} (293.40/sq mi)
- Time zone: UTC+1 (CET)
  - Summer (DST): UTC+2 (CEST)
- ISO 3166 code: SE
- Province: Uppland
- Municipal code: 0380
- Website: www.uppsala.se

Uppsala Municipality (Swedish: Uppsala kommun) is a municipality in Uppsala County in east central Sweden. Uppsala has a population of 247,269 (as of 30 June 2025). Its seat is located in the university city of Uppsala.

Uppsala Municipality was created through amalgamations taking place during the late sixties and the early seventies. There are about thirty original local government units combined in the present municipality. A split took place in 2003, when Knivsta Municipality was formed.

== Towns and villages ==
By population:

- Uppsala (seat)
- Sävja
- Storvreta
- Björklinge
- Bälinge
- Vattholma
- Vänge
- Lövstalöt
- Almunge
- Länna
- Skyttorp
- Ytternäs och Vreta
- Knutby
- Gåvsta
- Järlåsa
- Gunsta
- Skölsta
- Ramstalund
- Håga
- Vårdsätra
- Skoby
- Läby
- Blackstalund

== Economy ==
Largest operating companies in Uppsala:

- Erasteel, metallurgy
- Cytiva, biotechnology
- Upplands Motor, car dealership
- Beijer Alma, technology
- Fresenius Kabi, healthcare
- Thermo Scientific, pharmaceutical company
- Uppsala Kommun, county admin
- Stora Enso, renewables
- Biotage, healthcare
- Galderma, healthcare

== Government and politics ==
Historically, Uppsala Municipality has been a centre both of conservatism and liberalism, both receiving their ideological nourishment from the university. Today, however, the city is divided between left and right and has since 1994 been governed by a coalition of the Social Democrats, the Left Party and the Green Party until the 2006 elections where the centre-right coalition Alliance for Sweden won not only the national elections but also the regional.

Distribution of the 81 seats in the municipal council after the 2010 election:

- Moderate Party 23
- Social Democratic Party 21
- Green Party 11
- Liberal People's Party 8
- Centre Party 6
- Left Party 6
- Christian Democrats 4
- Sweden Democrats 2

Results of the 2010 Swedish general election in Uppsala:

- Moderate Party 29.5%
- Social Democratic Party 24.0%
- Green Party 11.2%
- Liberal People's Party 9.1%
- Centre Party 7.6%
- Christian Democrats 6.4%
- Left Party 6.4%
- Sweden Democrats 3.8%

== International relations ==
=== Twin towns — sister cities ===
The municipality has the following twinnings

- (Norway) Bærum
- (Denmark) Frederiksberg
- (Iceland) Hafnarfjörður
- (Finland) Hämeenlinna
- (Estonia) Tartu
- (United States) Minneapolis
- (South Korea) Daejeon
