= Fyris =

River in Uppland, Sweden

Fyris River
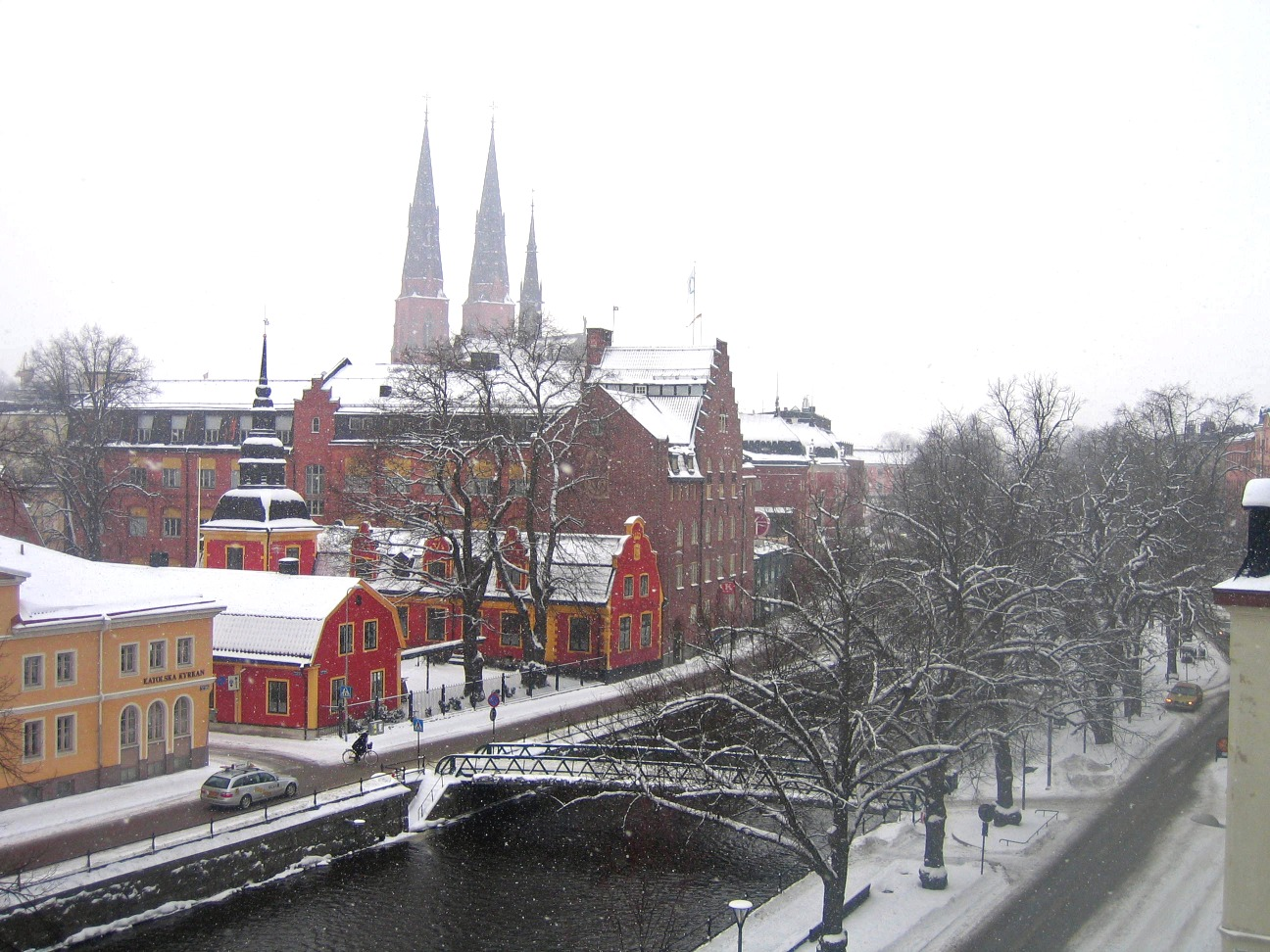
- The Fyris River in winter as seen from a hotel window in central Uppsala.
- Native name: Fyrisån (Swedish)

Location
- Country: Sweden
- County: Uppsala

Physical characteristics
- Source: Sundbro River
  - location: Östhammar Municipality
  - coordinates: 60°12′22″N 17°53′35″E
  - elevation: 0 m (0 ft)
- Mouth: Mälaren
  - location: Uppsala
  - coordinates: 59°47′12″N 17°39′20″E
  - elevation: 2 m (6 ft 7 in)
- Length: 80 km (50 mi)
- Basin size: 1,982 km^{2} (765 sq mi)
- Discharge
  - average: 14 m^{3}/s (490 cu ft/s)

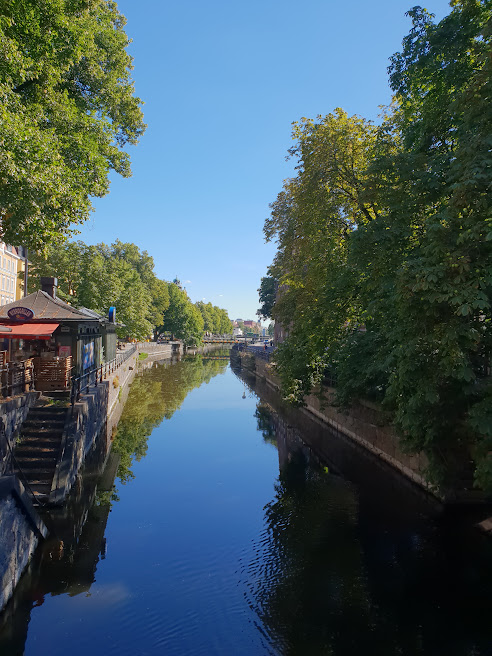
River Fyris from Nybron, Uppsala (August 2022)

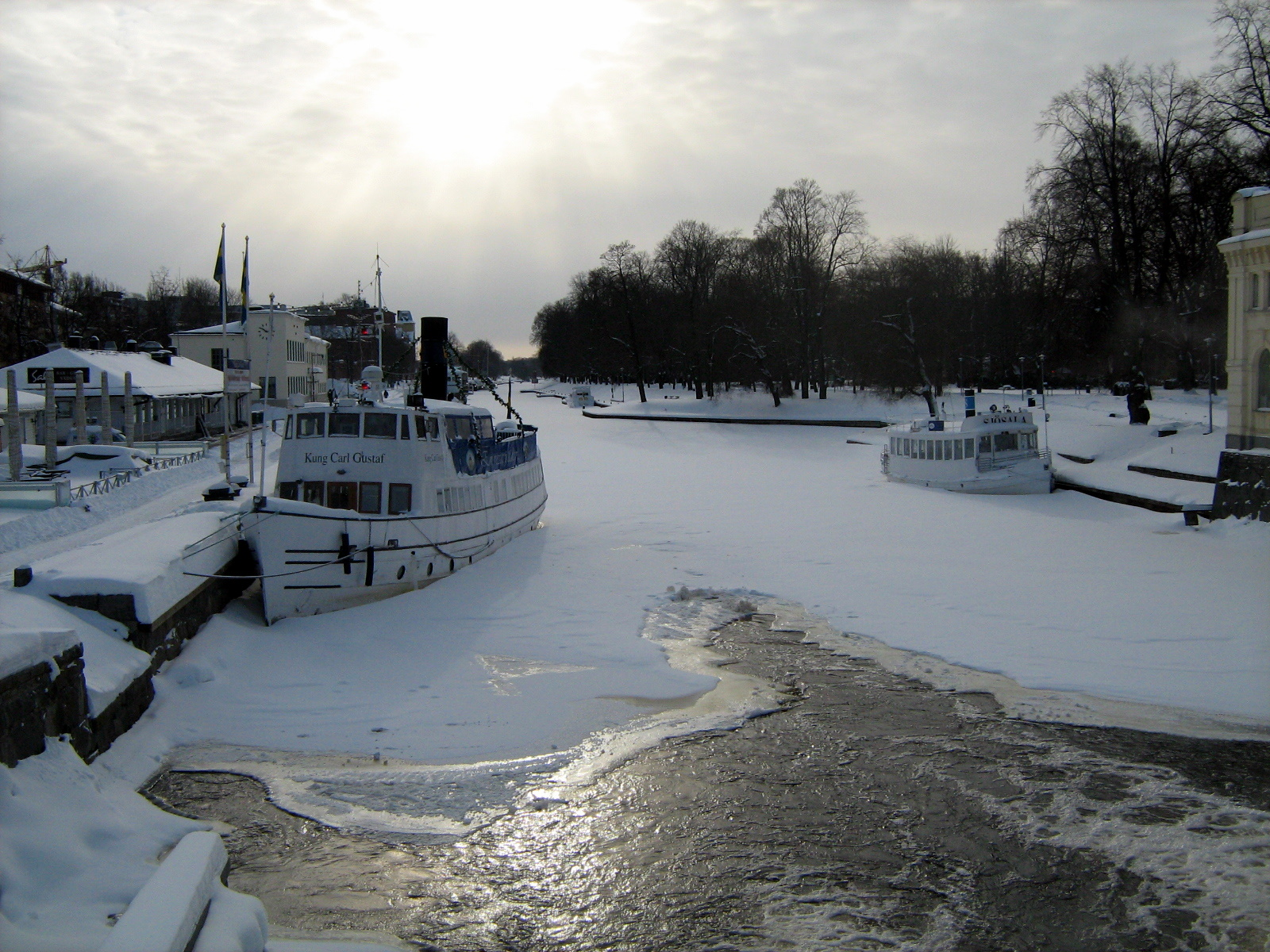
The Fyris river in winter (February 2010) as seen from Islandsbron, the bridge which marks the point to where the river is navigable

Fyrisån (Swedish pronunciation: [ˈfŷːrɪsˌoːn], "the Fyris river") is a river in the Swedish province of Uppland, which passes through the city of Uppsala and ends in Lake Mälaren.

The "Sala" river in Uppland was changed in the 17th century in memory of the Fyrisvellir battle, mentioned in the Icelandic sagas, as it was the belief that the marshy plains called "Föret" was the site of the famous Battle of Fýrisvellir in the late 10th century.

Boats can sail up the river from Lake Mälaren all the way to central Uppsala where two weirs make further progress impossible. In the summer of 2007, the construction of a fish ladder began to enable the asp, an endangered and potamodromous fish, to pass the weirs and reach its spawning waters. On the last day of April every year, during The Uppsala River Rafting Event, students attempt to navigate the weirs on homemade rafts with predictable results.
