= UppCon =

Swedish anime and manga convention, 2001–2012

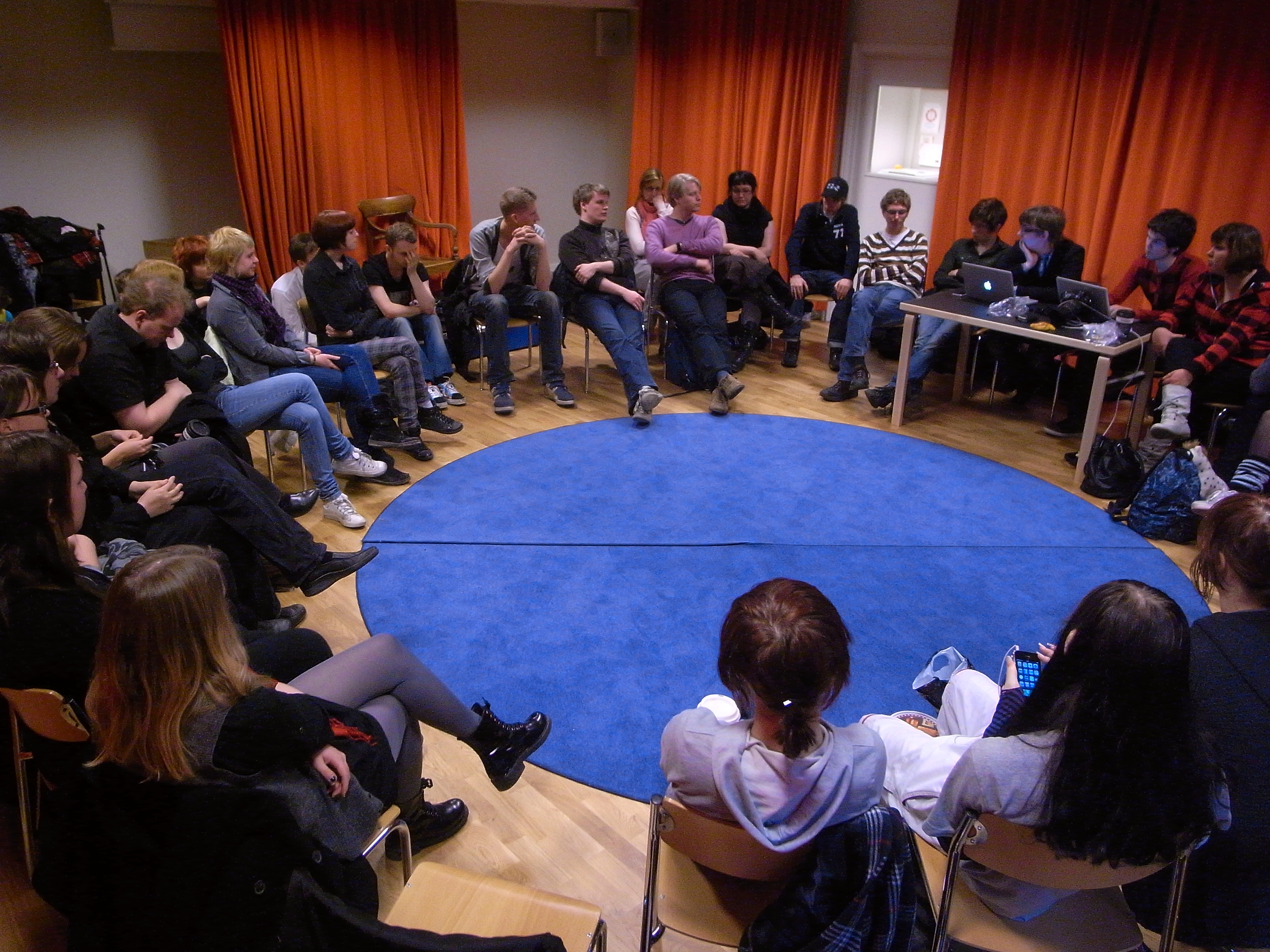
- Uppcon Luciamöte, an event around St. Lucia's Day
- Status: defunct
- Locations: Uppsala Konsert & Kongress
- Country: Sweden
- Inaugurated: 2001
- Most recent: 2012
- Attendance: 3500 in 2011
- Organizer: Uppsalakai

UppCon was a Swedish anime and manga convention held annually in Uppsala. The event, which was arranged by the nonprofit organization Uppsalakai, was the largest event of its type in the Nordic countries. During the 1990s the name had been used by a now defunct gaming convention.

The first of the conventions was held in 2001, at the vintage cinema Slottsbiografen. Over the years the event had grown and in 2009 it had more than 3,000 attendants.

The conventions usually lasted for three days, from Friday to Sunday, where people with similar interests for example met up to watch anime, compete in cosplay-contests and play videogames.

Many organizations had put up tables to display products they had for sale. Most of them sold imported goods from Japan, such as manga, anime, figures, dolls, clothes and candy such as Pocky.

The eleventh UppCon was held on June 3–5, 2011. In May 2012 it was reported that the UppCon: 12-event would be the last UppCon arranged by its founders.

== History ==
=== Event history ===
Dates	Location	Atten.	Guests
October 19, 2001	Slottsbiografen; Uppsala, Sweden	60	
April 5, 2003	Slottsbiografen; Uppsala, Sweden	130	
January 31 – February 01, 2004	Slottsbiografen; Uppsala, Sweden	300	
April 1–3, 2005	Slottsbiografen; Uppsala, Sweden	500	
November 1–3, 2005	Atrium; Uppsala, Sweden	850	
April 7–9, 2006	Atrium; Uppsala, Sweden	1200	
October 13–15, 2006	Atrium; Uppsala, Sweden	1700	
September 27–30, 2007	Atrium; Uppsala, Sweden	2000	
January 16–18, 2009	Uppsala Konsert & Kongress; Uppsala, Sweden	3000	YMCK
April 9–11, 2010	Uppsala Konsert & Kongress; Uppsala, Sweden	3200	MinxZone and Seremedy
June 3–5, 2011	Uppsala Konsert & Kongress; Uppsala, Sweden	3500	Olivia Lufkin, Seremedy and Versailles.
June 15–17, 2012	Uppsala Konsert & Kongress; Uppsala, Sweden	3700	Move and Screw.
