= Uppsala =

City in Uppland, Sweden

- City
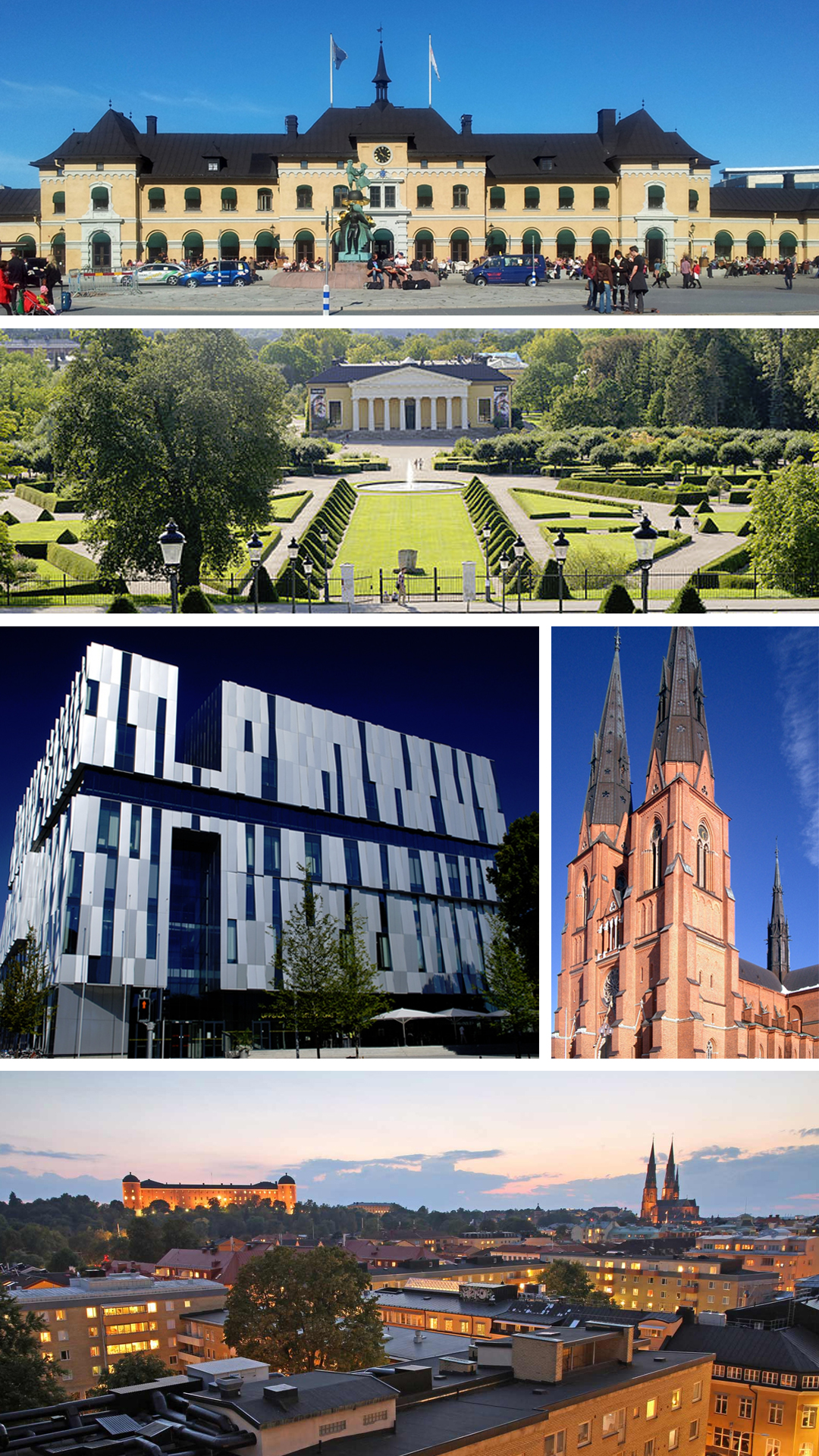
- Top to bottom and left to right: Old Central Station; Botanical Garden; Concert & Congress Hall; cathedral; skyline with castle and cathedral.

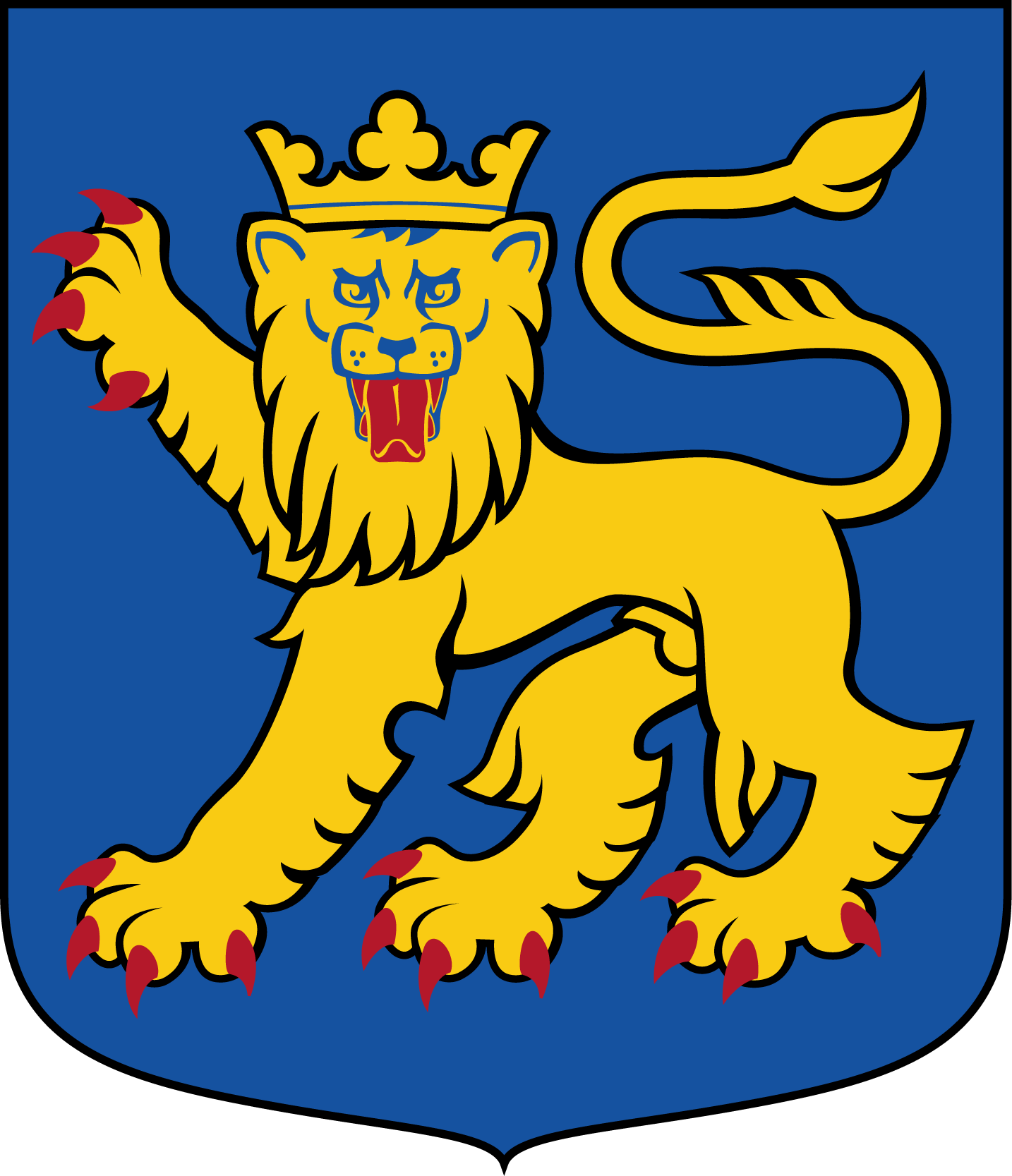
- Coat of arms

- Location within Uppsala Location within Sweden Location within Europe
- Coordinates: 59°51′29″N 17°38′41″E
- Country: Sweden
- Province: Uppland
- County: Uppsala County
- Municipality: Uppsala Municipality

Area
  - Total: 48.77 km^{2} (18.83 sq mi)
- Elevation: 15 m (49 ft)

Population (31 December 2019)
  - Total: 177,074
  - Density: 3,631/km^{2} (9,404/sq mi)
- Demonym(s): Uppsalabo, Upsaliensare
- Time zone: UTC+1 (CET)
  - Summer (DST): UTC+2 (CEST)
- Postal code: 75x xx
- Area code: +46(0) 18
- Website: uppsala.se

Uppsala (/ʌpˈsɑːlə/ up-SAH-lə; Swedish: [ˈɵ̂pːˌsɑːla]; archaically spelled Upsala) is the capital of Uppsala County and the fourth-largest city in Sweden, after Stockholm, Gothenburg, and Malmö. It had 177,074 inhabitants in 2019.

Located 71 km (44 mi) north of the capital Stockholm, it is also the seat of Uppsala Municipality. Since 1164, Uppsala has been the ecclesiastical centre of Sweden, being the seat of the Archbishop of the Church of Sweden. Uppsala is home to Scandinavia's largest cathedral – Uppsala Cathedral, which was the frequent site of the coronation of the Swedish monarch until the late 19th century.

Uppsala Castle, built by King Gustav Vasa, served as one of the royal residences of the Swedish monarchs, and was expanded several times over its history, making Uppsala the secondary capital of Sweden during its greatest extent. Today, it serves as the residence of the Governor of Uppsala County.

Founded in 1477, Uppsala University is the oldest centre of higher education in Scandinavia. Among the many scholars associated with the city are Anders Celsius, inventor of the centigrade temperature scale that now bears his name, and Carl Linnaeus, the father of taxonomy.

Other Uppsala residents include filmmaker Ingmar Bergman, diplomat Dag Hammarskjöld, chemists Jöns Jacob Berzelius and Svante Arrhenius, actress Viveca Lindfors, and singer Malena Ernman.

== History ==
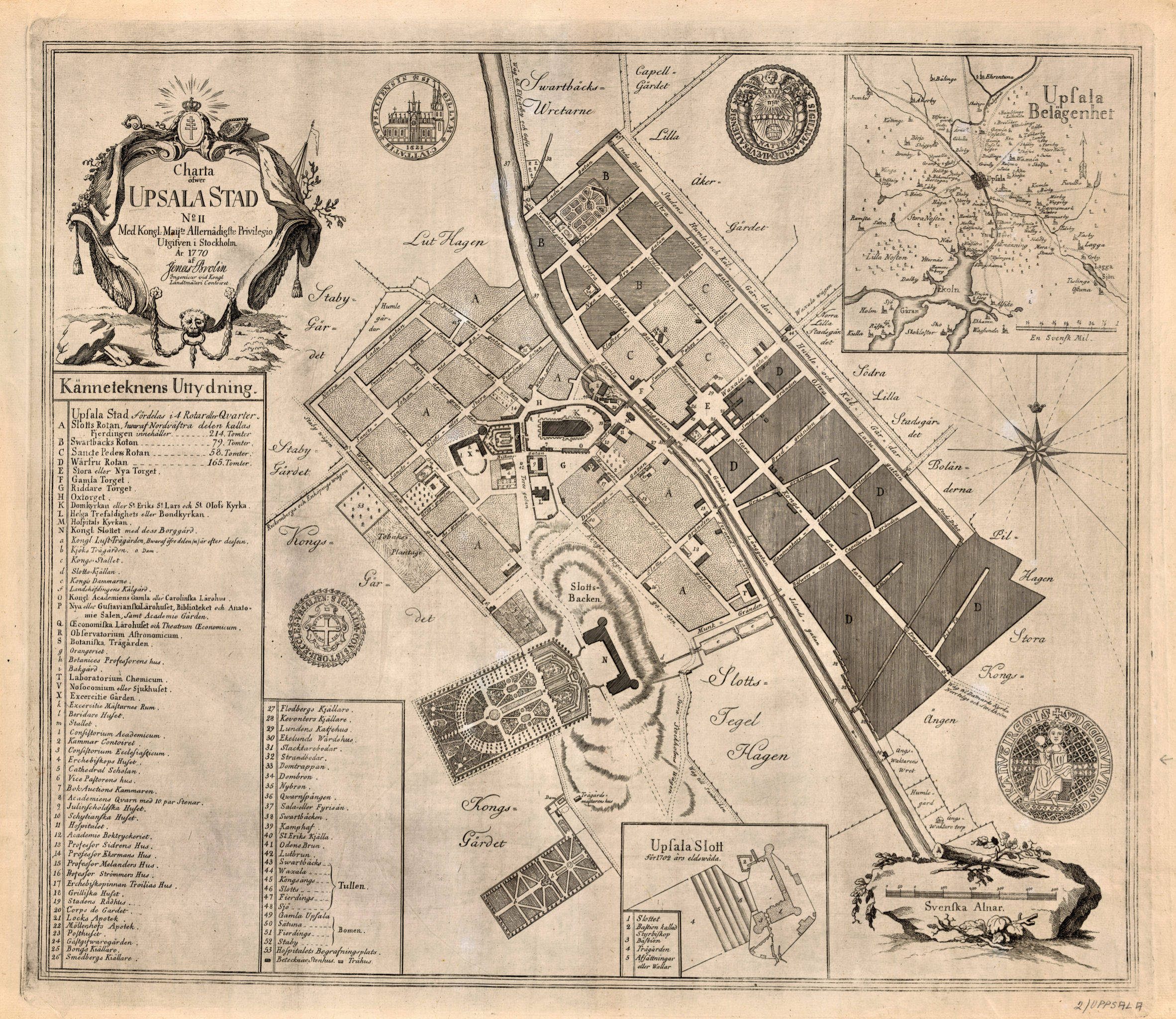
Map of Uppsala from 1770

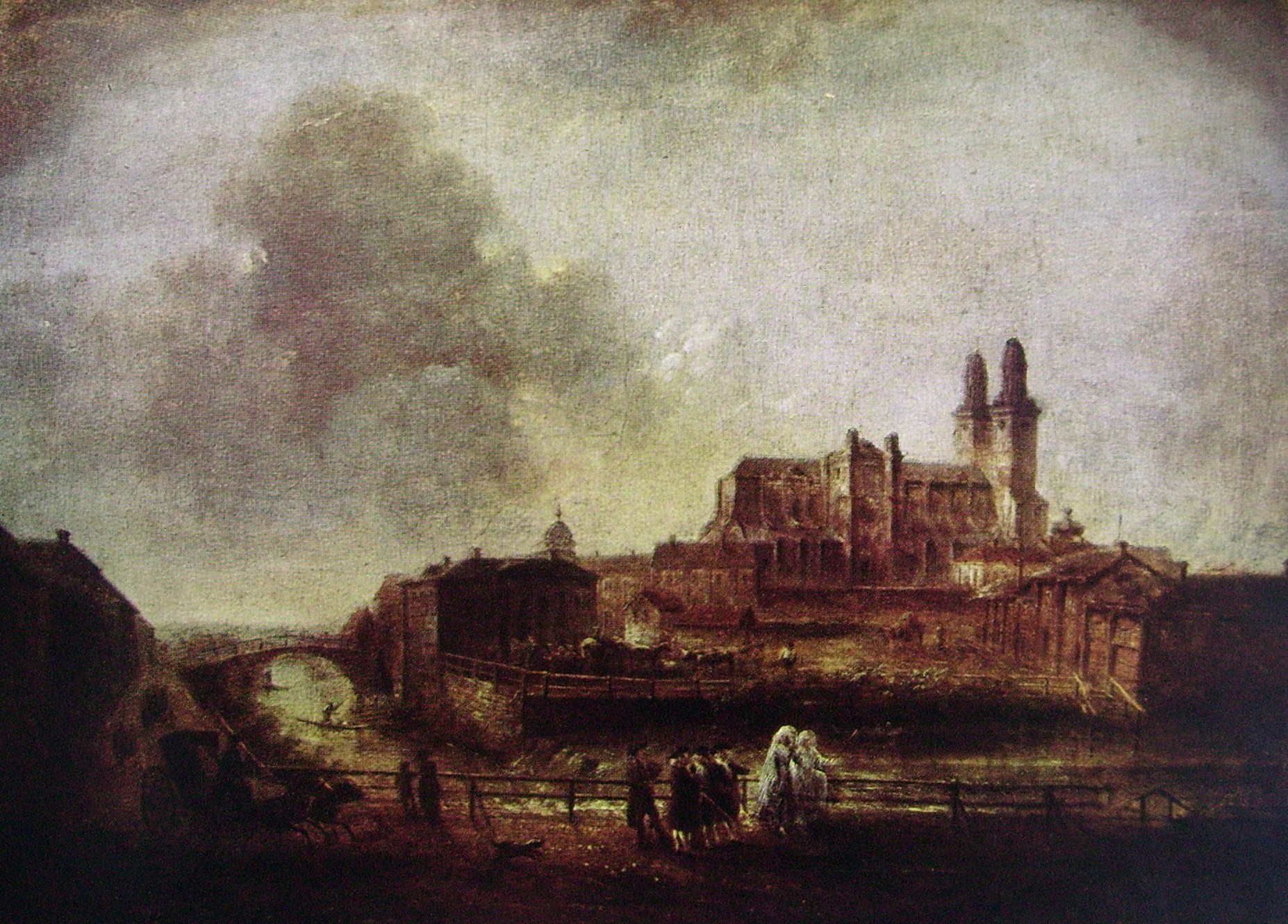
Uppsala in the 18th century

Uppsala originally referred to a location a few kilometres north of the current city, now known as Gamla Uppsala (Old Uppsala). Today's Uppsala was called Aros, 'river mouth', due to its location at the time at the mouth of the River Fyris in Ekoln, a bay in Lake Mälaren. The name became Östra Aros ('East Aros') to distinguish it from Västra Aros (present-day Västerås).

Old Uppsala was, according to medieval writer Adam of Bremen, the main pagan centre of Sweden, and the Temple at Uppsala contained magnificent idols of the Norse gods. The Kungsängen plains along the river south of Uppsala have been identified as a possible match for Fyrisvellir, the site of the Battle of Fyrisvellir in the 980s. Östra Aros was at that time a port town of Gamla Uppsala. In 1160, King Eric Jedvardsson was attacked and killed outside the church of Östra Aros, and later became venerated as a saint in the Catholic Church. In 1274, Östra Aros overtook Gamla Uppsala as the main regional centre, and when the cathedral of Gamla Uppsala burnt down, the archbishopric and the relics of Saint Eric were moved to Östra Aros, where the present-day Uppsala Cathedral was erected; it was inaugurated in 1435. The cathedral is built in the Gothic style and is one of the largest in northern Europe, with towers reaching 118.70 metres (389.4 ft).

The city is the site of the oldest university in Scandinavia, founded in 1477, and is where Carl Linnaeus, one of the renowned scholars of Uppsala University, lived for many years; both his house and garden can still be visited. Uppsala is also the site of the 16th-century Uppsala Castle. The city was severely damaged by a fire in 1702.

Historical and cultural treasures were also lost, as in many Swedish cities, from demolitions during the 1960s and 1970s, but many historic buildings remain, especially in the western part of the city. The arms bearing the lion can be traced to 1737 and have been modernised several times, most recently in 1986. The meaning of the lion is uncertain, but is likely connected to the royal lion, also depicted on the Coat of Arms of Sweden.

In ecclesiastical terms, the place has always belonged to Uppsala parish, from 1961 called Uppsala cathedral parish. The incorporated parts of Uppsala belong to Gamla Uppsala parish, Helga Trefaldighets parish and Vaksala parish. After parish break-up in 1974, parts of the town are located in Gottsunda parish. After further building expansion, some are also in Denmark-Funbo parish, before 2010 in Denmark parish.

Until 1971, the town was part of the district court for Uppsala City Hall Court and has been part of the Uppsala Court since 1971.

== Geography ==
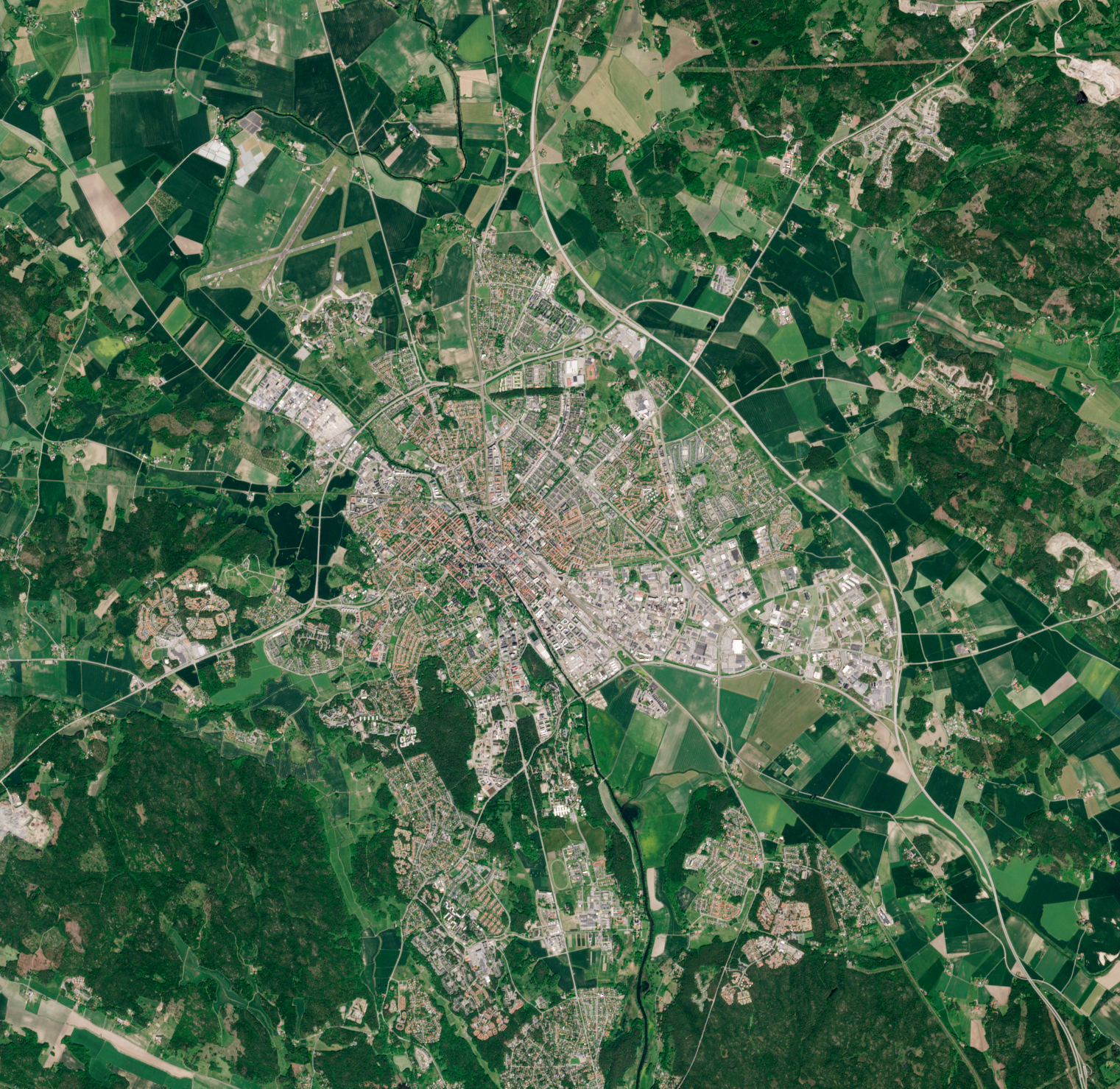
Satellite picture of Uppsala

Situated on the fertile Uppsala flatlands of muddy soil, the city features the small Fyris River (Fyrisån) flowing through the landscape surrounded by lush vegetation. Parallel to the river runs the glacial ridge of Uppsalaåsen at an elevation around 30 m (98 ft), the site of Uppsala's castle, from which large parts of the town can be seen. The central park Stadsskogen (literally "City Forest") stretches from the south far into town, with opportunities for recreation for many residential areas within walking distance.

Located approximately 70 km (43 mi) or 40 minutes by train from the capital, many Uppsala residents work in Stockholm. The train to Stockholm-Arlanda Airport takes 17 minutes, rendering the city easily accessible by air. Just like Stockholm, Uppsala is located on Sweden's east coast at the 59th parallel north.

The commercial centre of Uppsala is quite compact. The city has a distinct town and gown divide with clergy, royalty, and academia historically residing in the Fjärdingen neighbourhood on the river's western shore, somewhat separated from the rest of the city, and the ensemble of cathedral, castle and university buildings has remained mostly undisturbed to this day. While some historic buildings remain on the periphery of the central core, retail commercial activity is geographically focused on a small number of blocks around the pedestrianized streets and main square on the eastern side of the river, an area that was subject to a large-scale metamorphosis during the economically booming years in the 1960s in particular. During recent decades, a significant part of retail commercial activity has shifted to shopping malls and stores situated in the outskirts of the city. Meanwhile, the built-up areas have expanded greatly, and some suburbanization has taken place. Uppsala contains multiple lakes, adding to the large amounts of rain the city tends to receive very often.

=== Climate ===
Uppsala lies immediately south of the 60th parallel north and has a humid continental climate (Dfb), with cold winters and warm summers. Due to its northerly location, Uppsala experiences over 18 hours of visible sunshine during the summer solstice, and under 6 hours of sunshine during the winter solstice. Despite Uppsala's northerly location, the winter is not as cold as other cities at similar latitudes, mainly due to the Gulf Stream. For example, in January Uppsala has a daily mean of −2.7 °C (27.1 °F). In Canada, at the same latitude, Fort Smith experiences a daily mean of −22.4 °C (−8.3 °F).

With respect to record temperatures, the difference between the highest and lowest is relatively large. Uppsala's highest recorded temperature was 37.4 °C (99.3 °F), recorded on 9 July 1933. On the same day Ultuna, which lies a few kilometres south of the centre of Uppsala, recorded a temperature of 38 °C (100.4 °F). This is the highest temperature ever recorded in the Scandinavian Peninsula, although the same temperature was recorded in Målilla, Sweden, 14 years later. Uppsala's lowest temperature was recorded on 24 January 1875, when the temperature dropped to −39.5 °C (−39.1 °F). The second-lowest temperature recorded is −33.1 °C (−27.6 °F), which makes the record one of the hardest to beat, due to the fact that temperatures in Uppsala nowadays rarely go below −30 °C (−22 °F). The difference between the two records is 76.9 °C (138.4 °F).

The warmest month ever recorded is July 2018, with a daily mean of 22.0 °C (71.6 °F). Since 2002 Uppsala has experienced 7 months where the daily mean was 20 °C (68 °F) or warmer, the most recent in July 2021 when the daily mean was 20.7 °C (69.3 °F). The coldest month ever recorded is January 1814, when the daily mean was −14.9 °C (5.2 °F). Between January 1814 and January 1987, Uppsala experienced 23 months that were colder than −10 °C (14 °F). Since February 1987, the coldest month recorded is −8.6 °C (16.5 °F). The warmest year ever recorded was 2014, with an average temperature of 8.1 °C (46.6 °F). The second warmest is 2018, with 8.0 °C (46.4 °F). Since 1991, Uppsala has recorded 15 years with an average temperature of 7 °C (45 °F) or warmer. The coldest year ever recorded was 1867, with an average temperature of 2.5 °C (36.5 °F). 1987 was the last year Uppsala recorded a year with an average temperature below 5 °C (41 °F).

The climate table below presents weather data from 1981 to 2010. According to ongoing measurements, the temperature has increased during 1981–2010 as compared with the 1951–1980 series. This increase is on an annual basis around 0.9 °C. Warming is most pronounced during the winter and spring. January, February, and March have had the most pronouncing increase in temperature, with each month increasing 1.5 °C or more. The only month that did not get warmer is June, which got 0.3 °C colder. During the 20th century, Uppsala has warmed drastically, especially the winter. If compared to the period 1861–1890, the annual increase in temperature is 1.8 °C. March is the month with the biggest increase, where the temperature has increased more than 3 °C since the latter parts of the 19th century.

Winter normally arrives in late November, and lasts until the middle of March when spring arrives. Summer usually arrives in the middle of May, and lasts until late September when autumn arrives. Precipitation is most common between June and November, in all these months it falls 50 mm (2.0 in) or more on average. August receives most precipitation with 74 mm (2.9 in). Between January and May precipitation levels fall a bit, with all months receiving less than 40 mm (1.6 in) on average. Annual precipitation is 576 mm (22.7 in). Rainfall can occur all year round, although it is less common in January and February. Snowfall mainly occurs between November and March. Snowfall in October and April can happen from time to time, but not every year. During the night between 30 April and 1 May 2014, approximately 15 cm (5.9 in) of snow fell in Uppsala, the first recorded snowfall in May since 1981. Uppsala has an annual average snow cover around 100 days.

Climate data for Uppsala, Sweden (1981–2010 normals), Extremes 1722–present
Month	Jan	Feb	Mar	Apr	May	Jun	Jul	Aug	Sep	Oct	Nov	Dec	Year
Record high °C (°F)	10.7 (51.3)	11.9 (53.4)	20.2 (68.4)	26.8 (80.2)	32.8 (91.0)	34.5 (94.1)	37.4 (99.3)	34.3 (93.7)	27.8 (82.0)	22.0 (71.6)	15.6 (60.1)	12.6 (54.7)	37.4 (99.3)
Mean daily maximum °C (°F)	−0.3 (31.5)	0.1 (32.2)	3.8 (38.8)	10.1 (50.2)	16.4 (61.5)	19.8 (67.6)	22.7 (72.9)	21.2 (70.2)	15.9 (60.6)	9.7 (49.5)	4.0 (39.2)	0.7 (33.3)	10.4 (50.7)
Daily mean °C (°F)	−2.7 (27.1)	−2.8 (27.0)	0.2 (32.4)	5.2 (41.4)	10.9 (51.6)	14.7 (58.5)	17.7 (63.9)	16.2 (61.2)	11.4 (52.5)	6.5 (43.7)	1.8 (35.2)	−1.7 (28.9)	6.5 (43.7)
Mean daily minimum °C (°F)	−5.6 (21.9)	−6.2 (20.8)	−3.3 (26.1)	0.4 (32.7)	5.1 (41.2)	9.4 (48.9)	12.5 (54.5)	11.5 (52.7)	7.3 (45.1)	3.3 (37.9)	−0.8 (30.6)	−4.4 (24.1)	2.5 (36.5)
Record low °C (°F)	−39.5 (−39.1)	−30.9 (−23.6)	−32.1 (−25.8)	−22.4 (−8.3)	−11.8 (10.8)	−4.1 (24.6)	−1.0 (30.2)	−0.9 (30.4)	−5.2 (22.6)	−16.2 (2.8)	−23.6 (−10.5)	−28.2 (−18.8)	−39.5 (−39.1)
Average precipitation mm (inches)	39.3 (1.55)	29.7 (1.17)	32.6 (1.28)	31.7 (1.25)	38.7 (1.52)	61.0 (2.40)	65.1 (2.56)	73.6 (2.90)	52.4 (2.06)	53.1 (2.09)	52.9 (2.08)	45.6 (1.80)	575.6 (22.66)
Average snowfall cm (inches)	26 (10)	18 (7.1)	18 (7.1)	7 (2.8)	1 (0.4)	0 (0)	0 (0)	0 (0)	0 (0)	1 (0.4)	13 (5.1)	24 (9.4)	108 (43)
Average relative humidity (%)	87	85	79	70	66	69	71	76	81	86	90	90	79
Mean monthly sunshine hours	44.8	82.9	118.6	190.8	283.2	248.1	269.0	203.2	155.1	97.9	48.0	33.0	1,774.9

Climate data for Uppsala, 1991–2020 normals and extremes
Month	Jan	Feb	Mar	Apr	May	Jun	Jul	Aug	Sep	Oct	Nov	Dec	Year
Record high °C (°F)	10.7 (51.3)	11.3 (52.3)	20.2 (68.4)	26.8 (80.2)	29.7 (85.5)	31.5 (88.7)	34.4 (93.9)	33.3 (91.9)	27.2 (81.0)	22.0 (71.6)	14.3 (57.7)	12.6 (54.7)	34.4 (93.9)
Mean maximum °C (°F)	6.6 (43.9)	7.4 (45.3)	12.7 (54.9)	19.7 (67.5)	24.8 (76.6)	27.1 (80.8)	29.5 (85.1)	28.1 (82.6)	22.5 (72.5)	16.1 (61.0)	10.6 (51.1)	7.3 (45.1)	30.4 (86.7)
Mean daily maximum °C (°F)	0.4 (32.7)	0.9 (33.6)	4.8 (40.6)	11.2 (52.2)	16.8 (62.2)	20.8 (69.4)	23.6 (74.5)	22.1 (71.8)	16.7 (62.1)	10.0 (50.0)	4.6 (40.3)	1.7 (35.1)	11.1 (52.0)
Daily mean °C (°F)	−2.0 (28.4)	−2.0 (28.4)	1.0 (33.8)	6.0 (42.8)	11.1 (52.0)	15.3 (59.5)	18.2 (64.8)	16.9 (62.4)	12.2 (54.0)	6.7 (44.1)	2.5 (36.5)	−0.6 (30.9)	7.1 (44.8)
Mean daily minimum °C (°F)	−4.6 (23.7)	−5.0 (23.0)	−2.5 (27.5)	1.1 (34.0)	5.6 (42.1)	10.1 (50.2)	13.1 (55.6)	12.2 (54.0)	8.3 (46.9)	3.7 (38.7)	0.1 (32.2)	−3.0 (26.6)	3.3 (37.9)
Mean minimum °C (°F)	−16.7 (1.9)	−14.9 (5.2)	−11.4 (11.5)	−5.2 (22.6)	−0.9 (30.4)	4.3 (39.7)	8.0 (46.4)	6.0 (42.8)	0.9 (33.6)	−4.5 (23.9)	−8.7 (16.3)	−12.8 (9.0)	−18.4 (−1.1)
Record low °C (°F)	−24.2 (−11.6)	−23.6 (−10.5)	−25.0 (−13.0)	−9.0 (15.8)	−5.0 (23.0)	1.6 (34.9)	5.7 (42.3)	1.1 (34.0)	−4.1 (24.6)	−11.3 (11.7)	−16.4 (2.5)	−25.0 (−13.0)	−25.0 (−13.0)
Average precipitation mm (inches)	38.8 (1.53)	31.8 (1.25)	28.7 (1.13)	31.8 (1.25)	39.3 (1.55)	61.2 (2.41)	57.4 (2.26)	73.6 (2.90)	48.6 (1.91)	63.4 (2.50)	52.8 (2.08)	47.3 (1.86)	564.9 (22.24)
Source 1: SMHI Open Data
Source 2: SMHI 1991–2020 normals

Climate data for Uppsala (2002–2018 averages & extremes)
Month	Jan	Feb	Mar	Apr	May	Jun	Jul	Aug	Sep	Oct	Nov	Dec	Year
Record high °C (°F)	10.7 (51.3)	10.4 (50.7)	20.2 (68.4)	23.7 (74.7)	29.7 (85.5)	31.5 (88.7)	34.4 (93.9)	33.3 (91.9)	26.1 (79.0)	19.4 (66.9)	13.5 (56.3)	12.6 (54.7)	34.4 (93.9)
Mean maximum °C (°F)	6.5 (43.7)	6.9 (44.4)	13.4 (56.1)	19.4 (66.9)	25.3 (77.5)	27.8 (82.0)	30.1 (86.2)	28.4 (83.1)	22.6 (72.7)	15.9 (60.6)	11.0 (51.8)	7.5 (45.5)	30.8 (87.4)
Mean daily maximum °C (°F)	−0.1 (31.8)	0.6 (33.1)	4.9 (40.8)	11.7 (53.1)	17.5 (63.5)	21.1 (70.0)	24.1 (75.4)	22.3 (72.1)	17.2 (63.0)	9.9 (49.8)	4.9 (40.8)	1.8 (35.2)	11.3 (52.4)
Daily mean °C (°F)	−2.6 (27.3)	−2.2 (28.0)	1.0 (33.8)	5.5 (41.9)	11.9 (53.4)	15.6 (60.1)	18.8 (65.8)	17.4 (63.3)	12.9 (55.2)	6.7 (44.1)	2.7 (36.9)	−0.6 (30.9)	7.3 (45.1)
Mean daily minimum °C (°F)	−5.1 (22.8)	−5.0 (23.0)	−2.9 (26.8)	1.3 (34.3)	6.2 (43.2)	10.1 (50.2)	13.5 (56.3)	12.4 (54.3)	8.6 (47.5)	3.4 (38.1)	0.4 (32.7)	−3.0 (26.6)	3.3 (38.0)
Mean minimum °C (°F)	−16.7 (1.9)	−14.9 (5.2)	−11.5 (11.3)	−5.0 (23.0)	−0.7 (30.7)	4.0 (39.2)	8.2 (46.8)	5.7 (42.3)	1.1 (34.0)	−4.3 (24.3)	−8.1 (17.4)	−12.5 (9.5)	−19.1 (−2.4)
Record low °C (°F)	−24.2 (−11.6)	−23.6 (−10.5)	−25.0 (−13.0)	−8.8 (16.2)	−5.0 (23.0)	1.6 (34.9)	5.7 (42.3)	1.1 (34.0)	−1.8 (28.8)	−10.6 (12.9)	−16.4 (2.5)	−23.8 (−10.8)	−25.0 (−13.0)
Average precipitation mm (inches)	42.5 (1.67)	34.0 (1.34)	26.5 (1.04)	28.8 (1.13)	39.5 (1.56)	64.6 (2.54)	55.1 (2.17)	78.9 (3.11)	47.2 (1.86)	51.4 (2.02)	55.1 (2.17)	45.8 (1.80)	569.4 (22.41)
Mean monthly sunshine hours	34.6	69.5	158.7	221.7	271.4	274.9	284.2	238.8	167.8	103.5	47.9	30.3	1,903.3
Source: SMHI Open Data

Climate data for Uppsala, Sweden (1961–1990 normals), Extremes 1722–present
Month	Jan	Feb	Mar	Apr	May	Jun	Jul	Aug	Sep	Oct	Nov	Dec	Year
Record high °C (°F)	10.7 (51.3)	11.9 (53.4)	20.2 (68.4)	26.8 (80.2)	32.8 (91.0)	34.5 (94.1)	37.4 (99.3)	34.3 (93.7)	27.8 (82.0)	22.0 (71.6)	14.3 (57.7)	12.6 (54.7)	37.4 (99.3)
Mean maximum °C (°F)	4.8 (40.6)	5.4 (41.7)	9.7 (49.5)	17.1 (62.8)	24.3 (75.7)	27.5 (81.5)	27.4 (81.3)	26.3 (79.3)	20.9 (69.6)	15.7 (60.3)	9.8 (49.6)	6.4 (43.5)	29.1 (84.4)
Mean daily maximum °C (°F)	−1.5 (29.3)	−1.2 (29.8)	2.9 (37.2)	8.6 (47.5)	15.7 (60.3)	20.4 (68.7)	21.4 (70.5)	20.1 (68.2)	15.0 (59.0)	9.6 (49.3)	3.5 (38.3)	0.1 (32.2)	9.6 (49.3)
Daily mean °C (°F)	−4.2 (24.4)	−4.3 (24.3)	−0.9 (30.4)	4.0 (39.2)	10.2 (50.4)	15.0 (59.0)	16.4 (61.5)	15.2 (59.4)	10.8 (51.4)	6.4 (43.5)	1.2 (34.2)	−2.6 (27.3)	5.7 (42.3)
Mean daily minimum °C (°F)	−7.1 (19.2)	−7.4 (18.7)	−4.3 (24.3)	−0.2 (31.6)	4.8 (40.6)	9.5 (49.1)	11.6 (52.9)	10.7 (51.3)	7.1 (44.8)	3.4 (38.1)	−1.3 (29.7)	−5.5 (22.1)	1.8 (35.2)
Mean minimum °C (°F)	−17.7 (0.1)	−17.9 (−0.2)	−13.7 (7.3)	−6.7 (19.9)	−1.2 (29.8)	3.2 (37.8)	7.1 (44.8)	5.1 (41.2)	−0.1 (31.8)	−3.7 (25.3)	−10.0 (14.0)	−16.6 (2.1)	−21.7 (−7.1)
Record low °C (°F)	−39.5 (−39.1)	−30.9 (−23.6)	−32.1 (−25.8)	−22.4 (−8.3)	−11.8 (10.8)	−4.1 (24.6)	−1.0 (30.2)	−0.9 (30.4)	−5.2 (22.6)	−16.2 (2.8)	−23.6 (−10.5)	−28.2 (−18.8)	−39.5 (−39.1)
Average precipitation mm (inches)	38.0 (1.50)	26.9 (1.06)	27.9 (1.10)	29.1 (1.15)	32.7 (1.29)	44.8 (1.76)	75.2 (2.96)	64.8 (2.55)	59.2 (2.33)	50.6 (1.99)	52.6 (2.07)	43.5 (1.71)	545.2 (21.46)
Average extreme snow depth cm (inches)	23.0 (9.1)	28.4 (11.2)	27.1 (10.7)	10.2 (4.0)	0.5 (0.2)	0 (0)	0 (0)	0 (0)	0 (0)	0.7 (0.3)	8.3 (3.3)	16.9 (6.7)	32.6 (12.8)
Average relative humidity (%)	85.4	83.1	77.5	70.8	65.4	65.5	71.0	74.9	78.8	82.8	85.8	85.9	77.2

== Economy ==
Uppsala has economic development in many sectors. Today Uppsala is well established in medical research and recognised for its leading position in biotechnology.

- Abbott Medical Optics (AMO)
- Cytiva
- Pfizer (see Pharmacia)
- Phadia, an offshoot of Pharmacia, now a part of Thermo Fisher Scientific
- Fresenius
- Q-Med (bioscience)
- Biotage
- Skandion Kliniken, proton therapy centre
- Uppsala Monitoring Centre, a collaboration between the WHO and the Swedish government known for their 'WHODD' medical coding dictionary.
- IAR Systems

== Higher education ==
=== Universities ===
- Uppsala University. Founded in 1477, under bishop Jakob Ulvsson. Originally a Catholic institution, after limited activity following the Reformation it was re-organised as a Lutheran institution in 1595, following the Uppsala Synod in 1593. The university has a famous anatomical theatre, constructed by the scientist and polymath Olof Rudbeck (1630–1702), in the old university building Gustavianum. The building is now a museum. The university has 13 student fraternities, known as "nations", each traditionally representing a geographical region of Sweden.
- Swedish University of Agricultural Sciences (SLU, Sveriges Lantbruksuniversitet, main campus).

=== Other higher education ===
- Johannelunds Teologiska Högskola. A Lutheran theological seminary established in 1862, located in Uppsala since 1970.
- The Newman Institute. A Catholic institution founded in 2001.
- Pingströrelsens teologiska seminarium. A Pentecostal theological seminary, which does not have accreditation from the Swedish National Agency for Higher Education and cannot confer Swedish academic degrees.

== Museums and sights ==
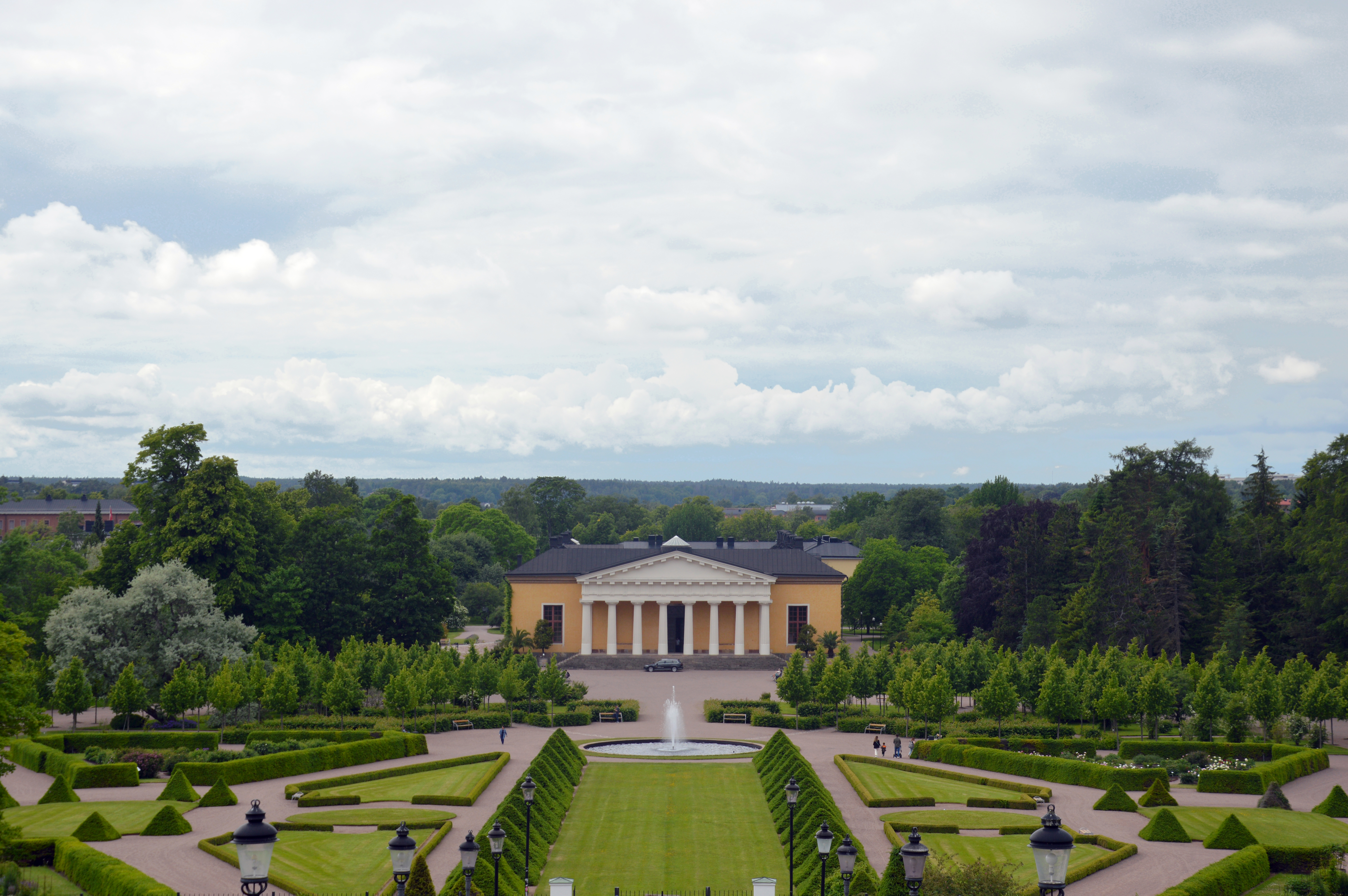
The Botanical Garden at Uppsala Castle

The Fyris river (Fyrisån) neatly divides the city into two different parts: the historic quarter to the west of the river and the modern administrative, residential and commercial city centre to the east. Most of the historical sights and university buildings are in the western part, with a medieval street layout, river views and parks and dominated by the cathedral.

The most outstanding building in Uppsala is the Domkyrka (Uppsala Cathedral), Scandinavia's largest church building (118.70 m (389.44 ft) high). Together with Uppsala Castle it has dominated Uppsala's skyline since its construction in the 13th century and can be seen from a long distance outside the city, other tall buildings being rare.

Facing the west end of the cathedral is the Gustavianum, built in 1625 to be the main building of the university, and served as such through most of the 19th century. It contains the Museum of Nordic Antiquities, the Victoria Museum (of Egyptian antiquities) and the university's cultural history collections. It also houses a perfectly preserved 17th-century anatomical theatre (used in its time for public dissections). Next to Gustavianum is the 18th century Archbishop's Palace, the official residence of the Lutheran Archbishop of Uppsala and the primate of the Church of Sweden.

Across the street from the Gustavianum in the University Park stands the University Hall, erected in 1879–1886 in Italian renaissance style. The Uppsala University Coin Cabinet is located in the university main building.

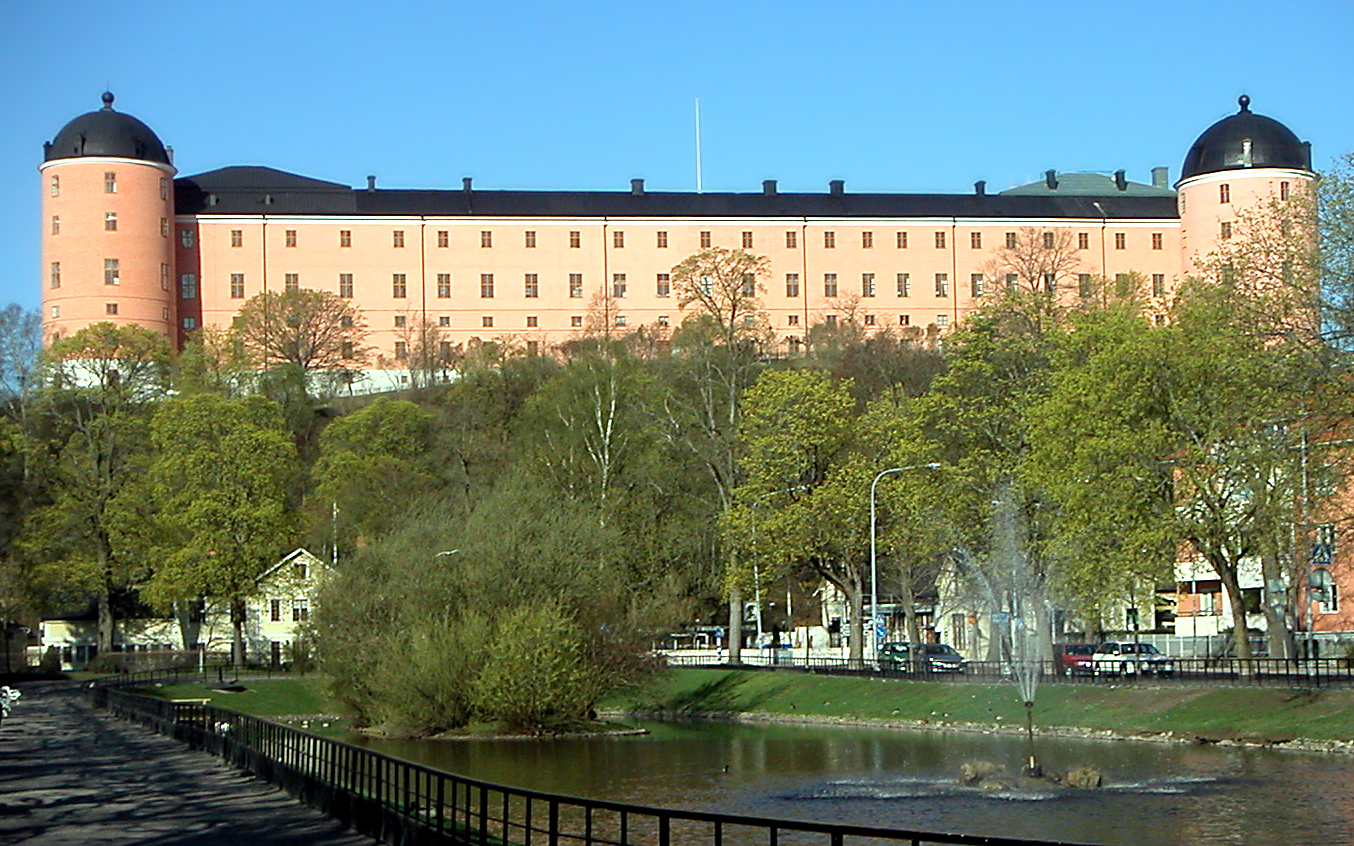
Uppsala Castle

Not far from the university stands the Uppsala University Library (Carolina Rediviva), the largest library in Sweden, with over 5 million volumes and some 60,000 manuscripts. The building was built in 1820–1841.

On a circa 35-metre high hill to the southwest of the University Library stands Uppsala Castle. Its construction was initiated in 1549 by King Gustav Vasa, founder of the Vasa royal dynasty. Today the castle holds several museums, among them the regional art museum, and is the residence of the Uppsala County Governor (landshövding).

There are several botanical museums in Uppsala related to the world-famous 18th century botanist and zoologist Carl Linnaeus; the Botanic Garden next to the castle, the Linnaean Garden in the city centre, and Linnaeus Hammarby, Linnaeus' summer house in the countryside village of Danmarks Hammarby south of the city.

5 kilometres (3 miles) north of Uppsala city lies Gamla Uppsala (Old Uppsala), the location of the pre-Christian settlement of Uppsala which later provided the new name for the medieval settlement further south. There are few remains, with the exception of several huge burial mounds of pre-Christian monarchs and the previous cathedral from 1164 A.D., traditionally said to be built over the old heathen temple (and recent archaeological investigations seems to support this notion). The site was a major religious centre in Scandinavia in pre-Christian times. After the old cathedral church burned down around 1240 it was only partially restored to a more modest size as it no longer was the seat of the Archbishop. The Gamla Uppsala Museum exhibits archeological finds made during excavations in Gamla Uppsala and related finds from other parts of Uppland, as well as exhibitions on the history of the site itself.

== Transportation ==
=== Roads ===
The European route E4 highway passes to the east of the city and provides the main connection by road to Uppsala. Several other smaller roads, such as Riksväg 72 and 55, connects the city with cities such as Enköping and Sala.

=== Public Transport ===
==== Buses ====
Buses within Uppsala Municipality and county are operated by UL. Bus lines in Uppsala go under two categories: city buses, and county buses. City bus lines, of which there are 15, are meant for journeys within the city. County buses, are instead meant for journeys within the wider municipality and county. The type of bus line can be seen by its colour, as city buses are painted green while county buses are painted yellow.

==== Trains ====
Uppsala Central Station is one of the busiest train stations in Sweden, with around 45 000 passengers per day. The station is served by several different train operators, with Mälartåg, SJ and SL being the primary ones, while Vy operates night trains to Narvik.

Trains depart Uppsala Central Station in three directions. There are trains to the south, Arlanda, Stockholm and Linköping, to the northwest, Dalarna and Sala, and to the north Gävle, Sundsvall, Östersund and to the northern half of Sweden as well as sleeper trains to Narvik in Norway.

==== Airports ====
While Uppsala has no civilian airport of its own, Arlanda Airport is located about 30 km south of Uppsala. Ärna Air Base north of Uppsala has been proposed for development as a commercial airport, but as of 2024 remains exclusively military.

== Sports ==
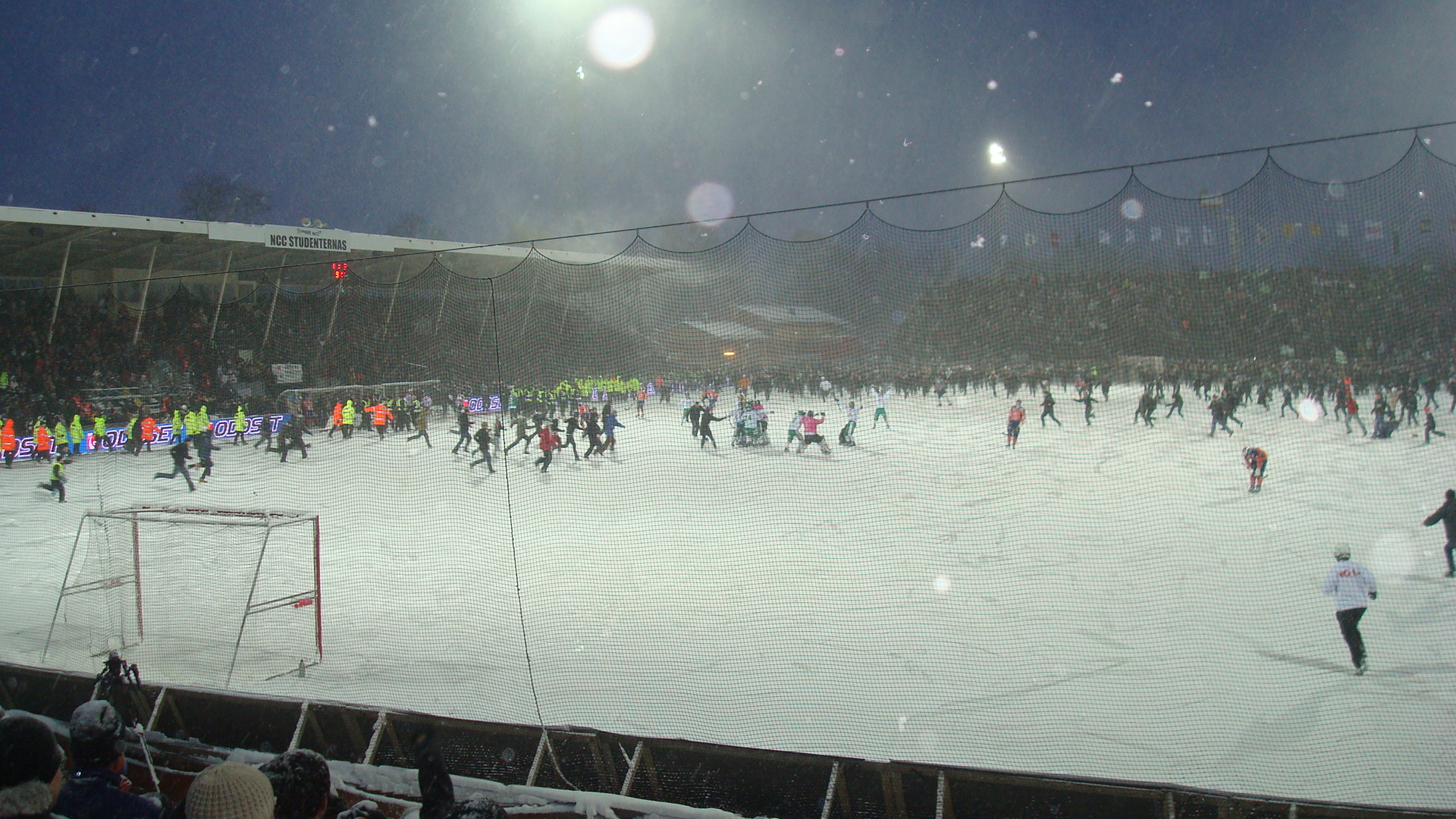
Celebrations after the 2010 national bandy final at Studenternas IP

The largest arena in Uppsala is Fyrishov and is Sweden's fourth most visited, specialized in swimming, sports events, meetings and recreation. The facility includes areas for indoor sports, summer sport and a generous waterpark with waterslides, 50-meter pool, training pool, relaxation area and a large outdoor swimming pool. Accommodation is offered at the Fyrishov cabin area, and at the resort restaurants a good lunch or dinner can be enjoyed. Fyrishov AB's business also includes the operation of Gottsundabadet in which there is a 25-metre pool, a 10-metre children's pool and gym. The entire facility is open all year round and a large number of meetings and various events are held here annually.

In addition to activities within the arena Fyrishov AB runs Tävlingsstaden Uppsala in a collaboration between the sports organizers, Fyrishov AB, Uppsala, Uppsala Tourism and hotel business. Co-founded in 2006 by Fyrishov AB under the name SM-town Uppsala in 2007 but was expanded to include international events and competitions at high national level. The project aims to develop Uppsala, a leading sports town in Sweden. In 2009 there were 24 SM-competitions and major national and international competitions in Uppsala.

At Fyrishov the city's basketball team Uppsala Basket also plays, former KFUM Uppsala, their home games in the Swedish basketball league. There are also athletic club Uppsala, Uppsala, fencing club, Uppsala Judo Club, Sweden's oldest judo club, Uppsala volleyball companion, Upsala weightlifting club and Upsala Simsällskap, one of the world's oldest swimmingclubs. The sport that draws the most audience is floorball. Uppsala's two teams in the Swedish Super League, Storvreta IBK and IK Sirius IBK, have Fyrishov as their home.

One of the most classical sports events, the Swedish bandy final, took place at Studenternas IP 1991–2012. After being played indoors in Stockholm 2013–2017, from 2018 it is again played in Uppsala. It usually attracts a spectator crowd of more than 20,000.

Once every year, the Uppsala Union of Science and Engineering Students arrange a river rafting in the Fyris river with rafts built from styrofoam.

Other sports clubs located in Uppsala include:

- Almtuna IS
- Gamla Upsala SK
- IF Vindhemspojkarna
- IK Sirius
- IK Sirius Fotboll
- Unik FK
- Upsala IF
- Uppsala Judoklubb
- Uppsala 86ers, American football club
- Upsala Fäktning, fencing club
- Upsala allmänna schacksällskap (UASS), chess club
- Uppsala Akademiska Roddarsällskap (UARS), rowing club
- Dalkurd FF

== Notable people ==
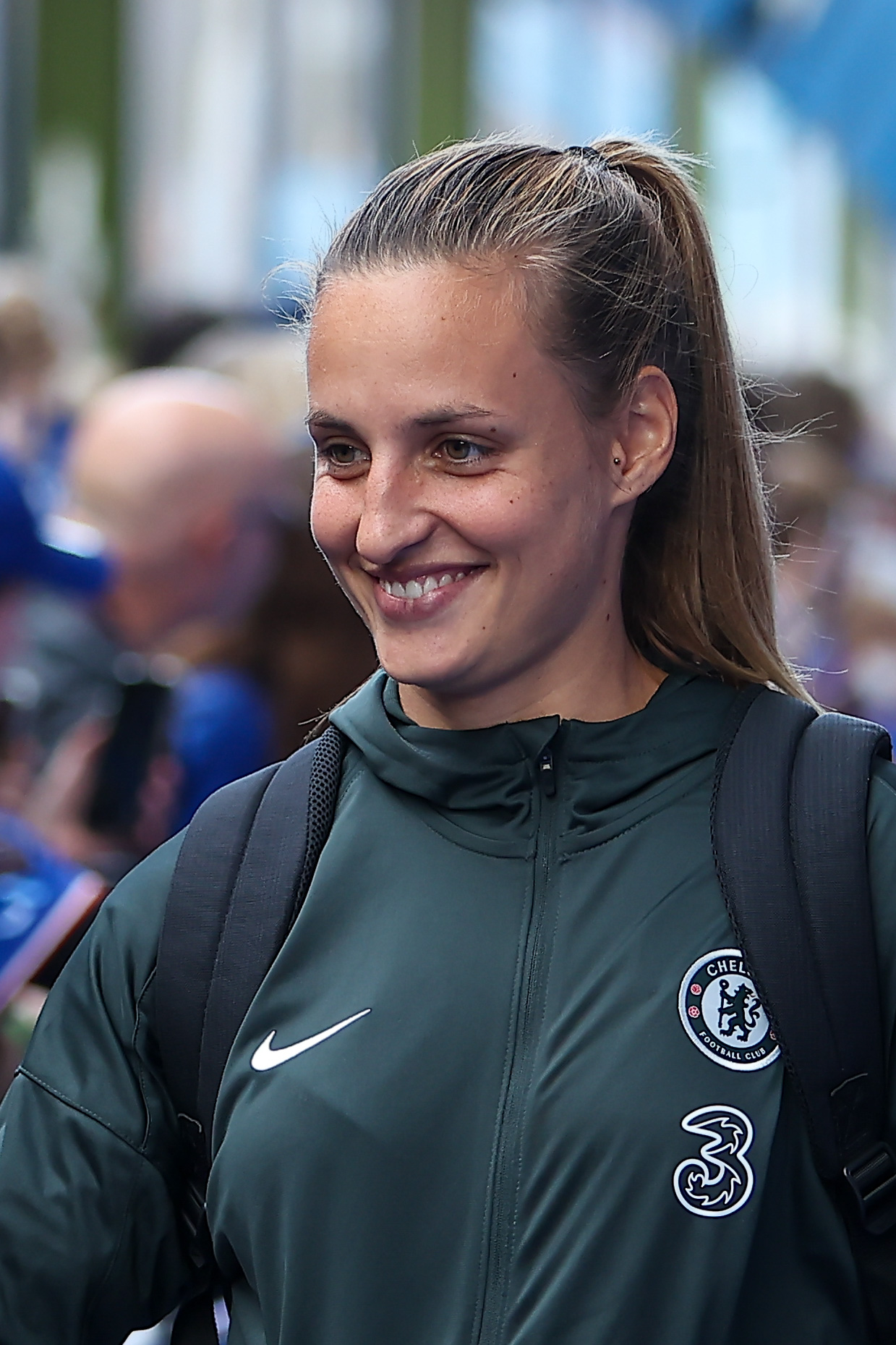
Nathalie Björn, footballer for the Sweden national team

- Adiam* (1982–), musician
- Pontus Åhman (1994–), rally driver
- Gerd Almgren* (1925–2008), journalist
- Amelia Andersdotter* (1987–), politician
- Magdalena Andersson* (1967–), politician, first female Prime Minister of Sweden (2021–2022)
- Ove Andersson (1938–2008), rally driver
- Filippa Angeldahl (1997–), footballer
- Anders Jonas Ångström (1814–1874), physicist
- Svante Arrhenius* (1859–1927), scientist
- Ingmar Bergman* (1918–2007), filmmaker
- Jöns Jakob Berzelius (1779–1848), chemist
- Nathalie Björn* (1997–), footballer
- Hans Blix* (1928–), diplomat
- Märta Boman (1902–1986), politician
- Emilia Brodin* (1990–), football player
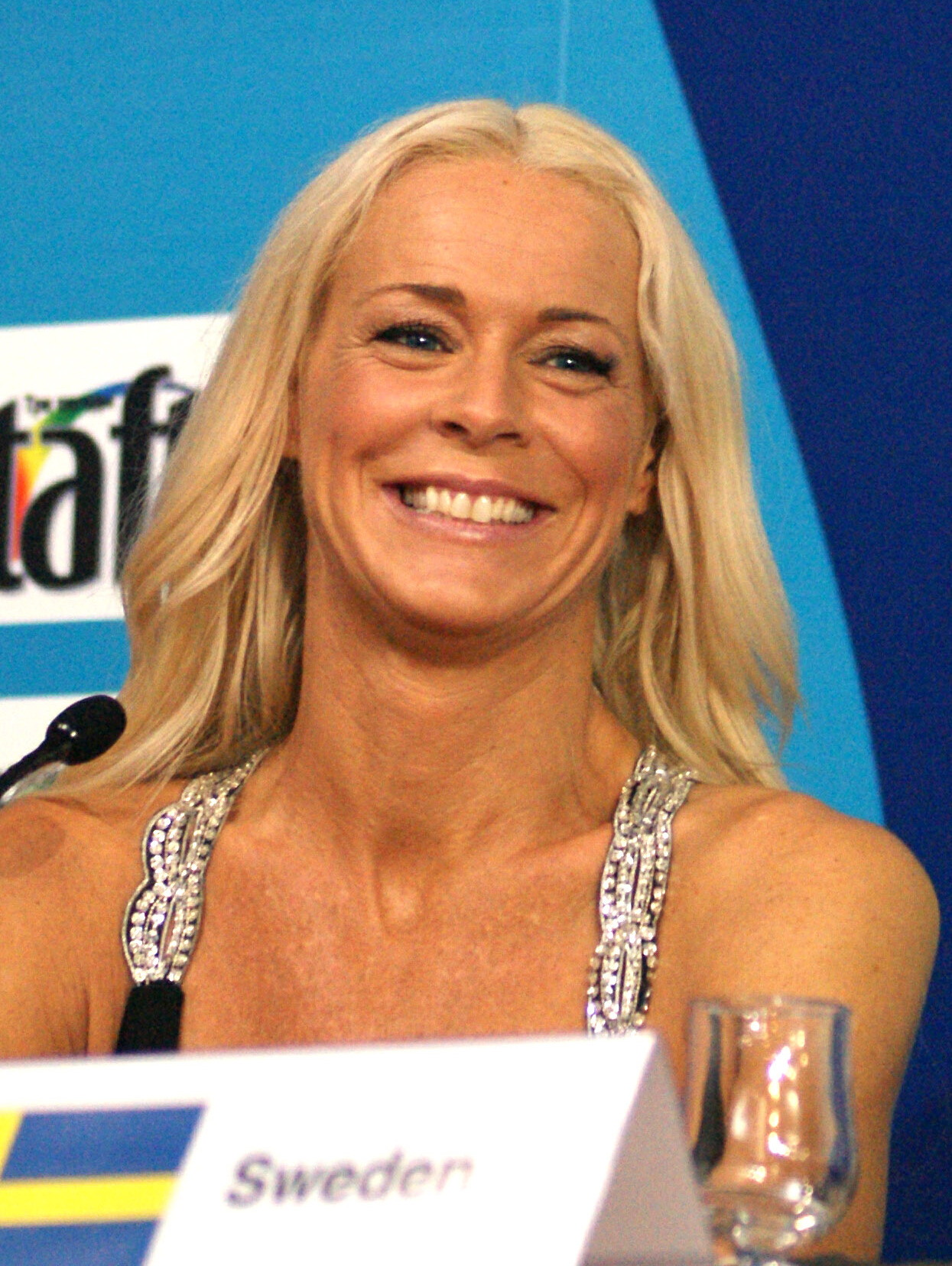
  Malena Ernman, opera singer
- Arvid Carlsson* (1923–2018), neuropharmacologist
- Anders Celsius* (1701–1744), astronomer
- Birgitta Dahl (1937–2024), politician, Speaker of the Riksdag
- Hans Dahlgren* (1948–), politician
- Lars Edlund (1922–2013), composer
- Ulf Ekman (1950–), pastor
- Stefan Eriksson* (1961–), criminal
- Martin Eriksson* (1965–), musician
- Marcus Eriksson* (1993-), basketball player
- Malena Ernman* (1970–), opera singer
- Johan Furåker* (1978–), Swedish/Danish artist
- Robert Hägg (1995–), ice hockey player for the Detroit Red Wings
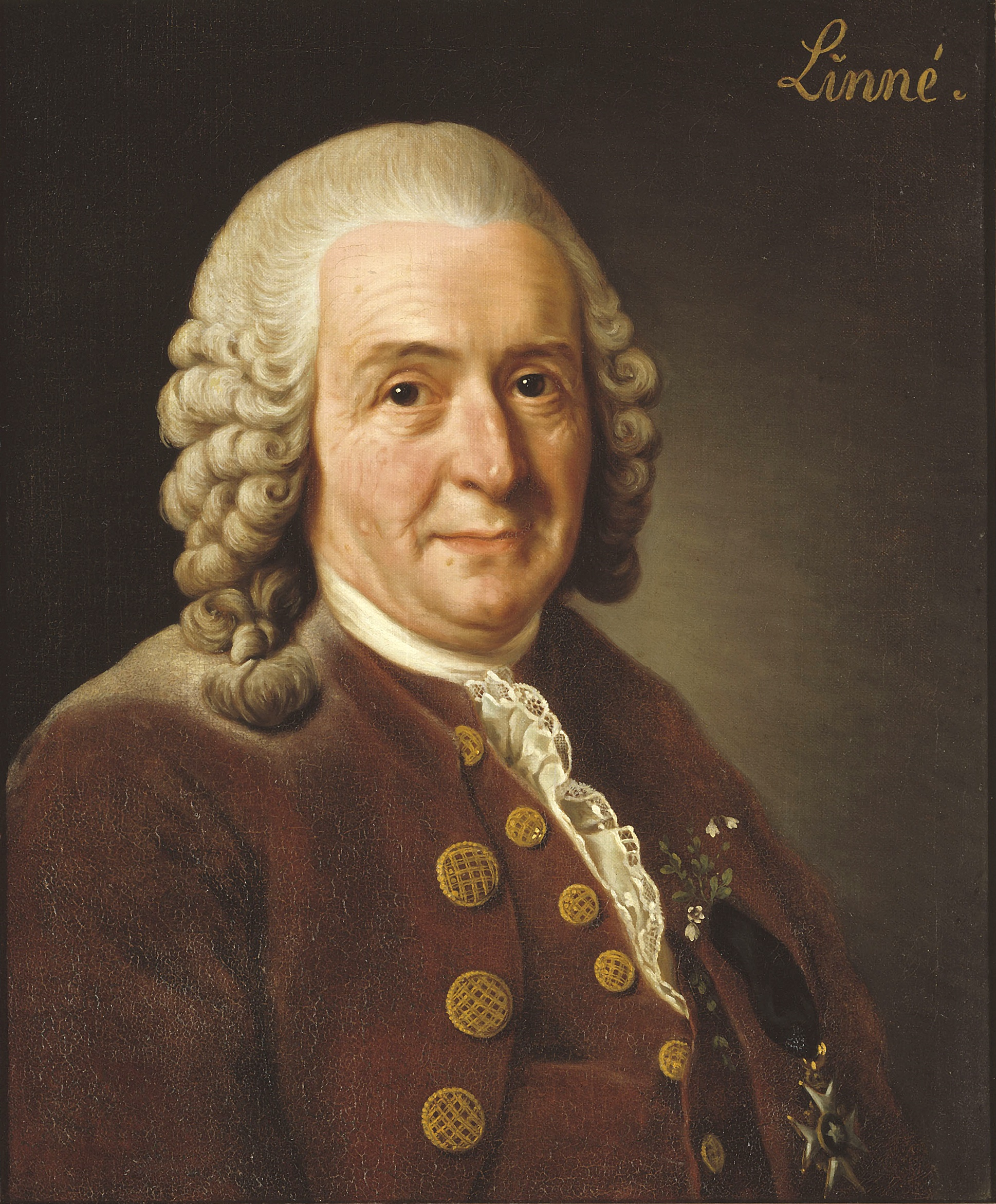
- Carl Linnaeus, scientist
  Torsten Hallman* (1939–), former motocross world champion
- Lars Hollmer (1948–2008), composer
- Dag Hammarskjöld (1905–1961), diplomat, Secretary-General of the United Nations (1953–1961)
- Magnus Hellberg* (1991–), hockey player
- In Solitude, heavy metal band
- Imp Kerr* (1980–), artist
- Mattias Klum* (1968–), photographer
- Gösta Knutsson (1903–1973), author and radio producer
- Anna Maria Lenngren* (1754–1817), poet.
- Carl-Bertil Laurell* (1919–2001), medical doctor and researcher
- Dave Lepard* (1980–2006), musician
- Bruno Liljefors* (1860–1939), painter
- Ruben Liljefors* (1871–1936), composer and conductor
- Viveca Lindfors* (1920–1995), actress
- Carolus Linnaeus (1707–1778), scientist
- Andreas Lundstedt* (1972–), singer
- Veronica Maggio* (1981–), singer
- Jan Mårtenson* (1933–), diplomat and author
- Håkan Nesser (1950–), author
- Stefan Parkman* (1952–), conductor
- Bo Johan Renck* (1966–), music artist and music video director
- Emma Rendel* (1976–), author and illustrator
- Hillevi Rombin (1933–1996), Miss Universe 1955
- Hans Rosling* (1948–2017), physician and statistician
- Olaus Rudbeckius (1630–1702), scientist
- Rasmus Sandin* (2000–), professional ice hockey player
- Dina Schneidermann (1930/1931–2016), musician
- Linda Sembrant* (1987–), footballer
- Snoh Aalegra* (1987–), musician
- Martin Söderström* (1990–), professional mountain biker
- Roine Stolt* (1956–), musician
- Emanuel Swedenborg (1688-1772), scientist, statesman, theologian and mystic
- Anders Tegnell* (1956–), physician and civil servant
- Owe Thörnqvist* (1929–), artist
- Rebecka Törnqvist* (1964–), artist
- Watain, black metal band

(* = born in Uppsala)

== References in popular culture ==
In the History Channel's Canadian-Irish TV series Vikings, Uppsala is visited by Ragnar Lothbrok and his entourage to worship the Aesir gods and offer a human sacrifice to appease them. In that visit Lothbrok meets Uppsala's King Horik. The episode was criticised for its poorly researched depiction of Uppsala, which was shown as being located in a mountainous region, as well as of its heathen temple, which in the series was built in the style of a medieval Christian stave church.

The literary series Pelle Svanslös (Peter No Tail) which follows the adventures of a cat with no tail and his friends created by author Gösta Knutsson takes place in Uppsala.

Umberto Eco's book The Name of the Rose includes a character of a young Scandinavian monk Benno of Uppsala.

In the video game Tom Clancy's Rainbow Six Siege, one of the defensive operators, Fenrir, is from Uppsala.

Progressive rock swedish band Kaipa are from Uppsala.

== See also ==
- Allianshallen
- Area code 018
- Ärna – Uppsala airport
- Battle of Fýrisvellir
- Disting
- Easter Riots
- Ellinor Skagegård & 5th Season – pop band from Uppsala
- Fyrishov – Fyrishov Water Park
- Gamla Uppsala – Old Uppsala parish
- Graneberg
- History of Uppland
- Temple at Uppsala – Temple of Old Uppsala
- UppCon – one of Scandinavia's biggest youth events
- Upplands Lokaltrafik – operator of local public transport
- Uppsala Central Station
- Uppsala Konsert & Kongress
- Uppsala Municipality – Uppsala "kommun"
- Uppsalatidningen – former free local newspaper
- Upsala College – former private college in East Orange, New Jersey, U.S., founded in 1893
- Upsala Nya Tidning – newspaper for Uppsala city and county
- Upsala-Lenna Jernväg
