= Gerd Almgren =

Swedish journalist (1925–2008)

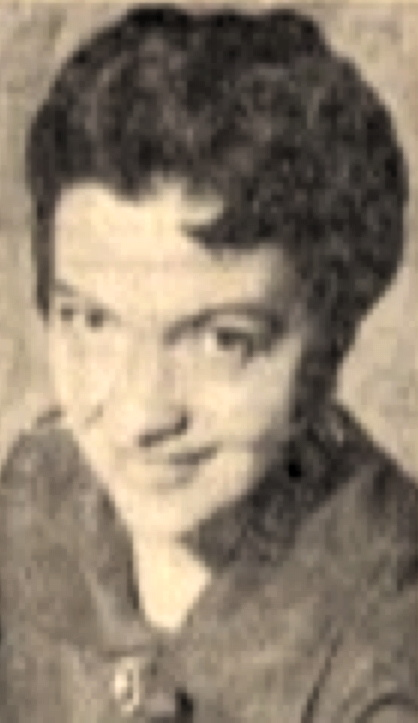
- Born: September 24, 1925; Uppsala, Sweden
- Died: September 25, 2008 (aged 83); Gräsö, Sweden
- Occupation: Journalist

Gerd Almgren (24 September 1925 – 25 September 2008) was a Swedish journalist and film-maker. She was a television presenter for the Swedish public broadcaster and reported from the Algerian War. From her reporting in Algeria she became remembered as "Madame Courage".

== Biography ==
Gerd Almgren was born in Uppsala County, Sweden. She was the daughter of Swedish archaeologist Oscar Almgren and Berta Almgren. Her brother was archaeologist Bertil Almgren.

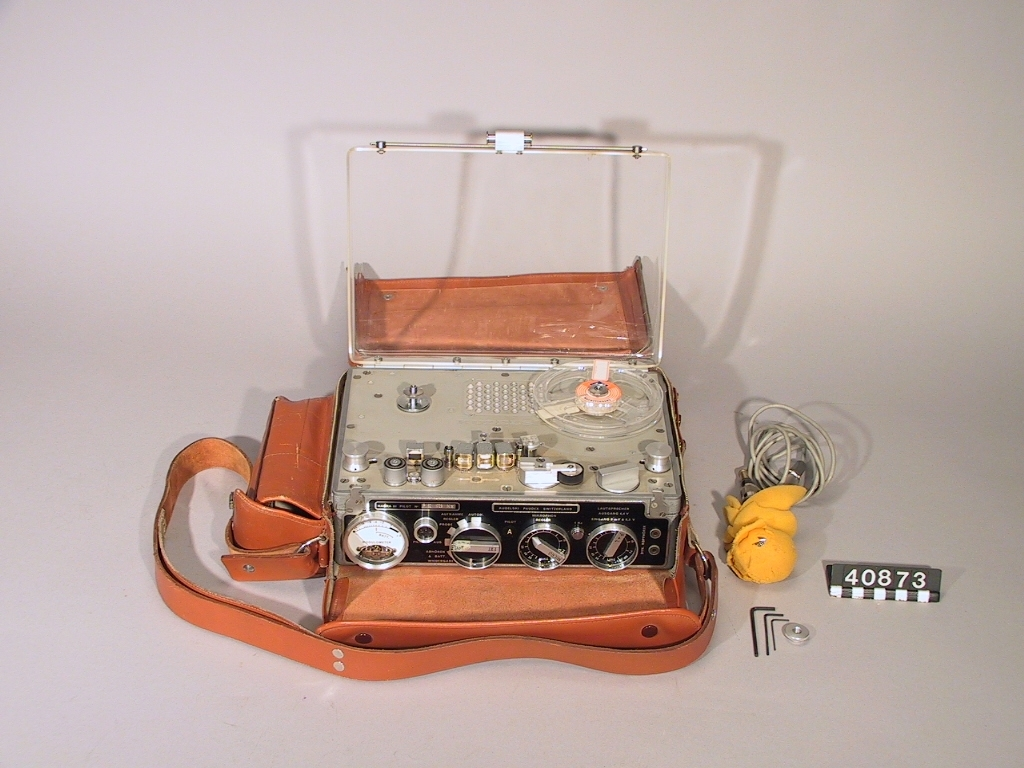
Nagra III Pilot tape recorder used by Almgren to record interview with Ben Bella 1962. Part of Swedish National Museum of Science and Technology collection.

Almgren attended the first television production program for national public broadcaster Radiotjänst in 1956. Almgren reported from the Algerian War for Swedish television. She left her position with the broadcaster after giving a First of May speech, but continued reporting for Swedish television as a freelancer.

After Algerian independence in 1962, she interviewed revolutionary leader Ahmed Ben Bella.

== Works ==
- Gerd Almgren (1958): Kakaokust. Stockholm: Natur och kultur
- Gerd Almgren and Bosse Ringholm (1973): Jorden runt: geografi, ekonomi, politik. Stockholm: Brevskolan
- Gerd Almgren (1987): "K A Almgrens sidenväveri" i Levande textil. (Svenska turistföreningens årsbok, 1988)
