= Ellinor Skagegård & 5th Season =

Swedish pop band

- Origin: Uppsala, Sweden
- Genres: Folk; Pop
- Years active: 2007–present
- Label: Independent
- Members: Ellinor Skagegård; Leonidas Aretakis; Rickard Hultberg; Daniel Färnstrand; Magnus Backström

Ellinor Skagegård & 5th Season is a pop band from Uppsala, Sweden, formed in 2007. The group is built around the songwriting of Ellinor Skagegård, with influences from pop, folk, jazz and musical.

== History ==
Since 2004 Ellinor Skagegård has performed with different groups and musicians, for example Mistletoe and the Swedish singing duo Svavelsyster. She recorded the EP "Fall Adventure" in 2007 together with Rickard Hultberg. Later that year they met up with drummer Daniel Färnstrand and guitarist Magnus Backström and formed "Ellinor Skagegård & 5th Season". The group had a number of bassists along the years and the seat was finally taken by Leonidas Aretakis in 2010. In May 2010 they released their debut album "First Time".

== Members ==
- Ellinor Skagegård – Lead vocals, piano
- Rickard Hultberg – Electric guitar
- Magnus Backström – Backing vocals, electric and acoustic guitar
- Leonidas Aretakis – Bass
- Daniel Färnstrand – Drums

== Discography ==
- Fall Adventure - 2007
- First Time - 2010
