= Allianshallen =

Indoor arena in Uppsala, Sweden

Coordinates: 58°20′50″N 11°56′35″E

Allianshallen is an indoor arena in Uppsala, Sweden, used mostly for floorball. It is the home arena of FBC Uppsala and of the women's team of IK Sirius IBK, while the men's team use Fyrishov as their home arena.

Allianshallen has been used as an indoor arena since January 1999, in a building which was formerly owned by publisher Almqvist & Wiksell.
