= Johan Furåker =

Swedish/Danish artist (born 1978)

Johan Furåker (born in 1978 in Uppsala) is a Swedish/Danish artist. He lives and works in Denmark. His work circles around unlikely life stories and truths that are stranger than fiction.

Furåker's main protagonist is Albert Dadas, a gasworks engineer who lived in Bordeaux in the late 19th century. Through painting, drawing and installation Furåker has recreated the life story of Dadas, who, by Phillip Tissié, was diagnosed with the first recorded case of pathological tourism, an uncontrollable urge to wander, as documented in Ian Hacking's book Mad Travellers. Dadas did not remember his journeys, but was able to recollect detailed memories in interviews under hypnosis. It is from these interviews Furåker builds the foundation of this ongoing project.

Another of Furåker's projects features Stefan Eriksson or "Fat Steve", a Swedish mobster. Through painting Furåker has depicting situations, locations, people and events in Eriksson's life. Also Luisa Casati, the eccentric Italian heiress, muse, and patroness of the arts, and Gabriele D'Annunzio, the Italian writer, poet, journalist, playwright and soldier, have been Furåker's protagonists.

Furåker mainly works with representational painting and drawing and is represented in the collection of CAPC, musée dárt contemporain in Bordeaux in France and in the collection of Malmö Art Museum in Sweden.

== Exhibitions ==
A large solo exhibition at CAPC in Bordeaux in France presented the works about Albert Dadas in its entirety in 2011. Furåker has also exhibited at institutions such as CCA Andratx in Spain, at Turku Art Museum in Finland, at Reykjavik Art Museum in Iceland, at Hannover Kunstverein in Germany and at Malmö Art Museum in Sweden. He has also had several gallery exhibitions in Sweden, such as solo shows at Gallery Ping Pong in Malmö and Galleri Flach in Stockholm.
