= Pingstförsamlingarnas teologiska seminarium =

The Pingstförsamlingarnas teologiska seminarium (English: Pentecostal Theological Seminary of Sweden) was a Pentecostal seminary located in Uppsala serving Pentecostal Christians of Sweden. In 2011 the seminary emerged with other religious organizations to found the new seminary Akademi för Ledarskap och Teologi.
