= Uppsala Konsert & Kongress =

Concert and congress hall in Uppsala, Sweden

Coordinates: 59°51′40.33″N 17°38′45.09″E

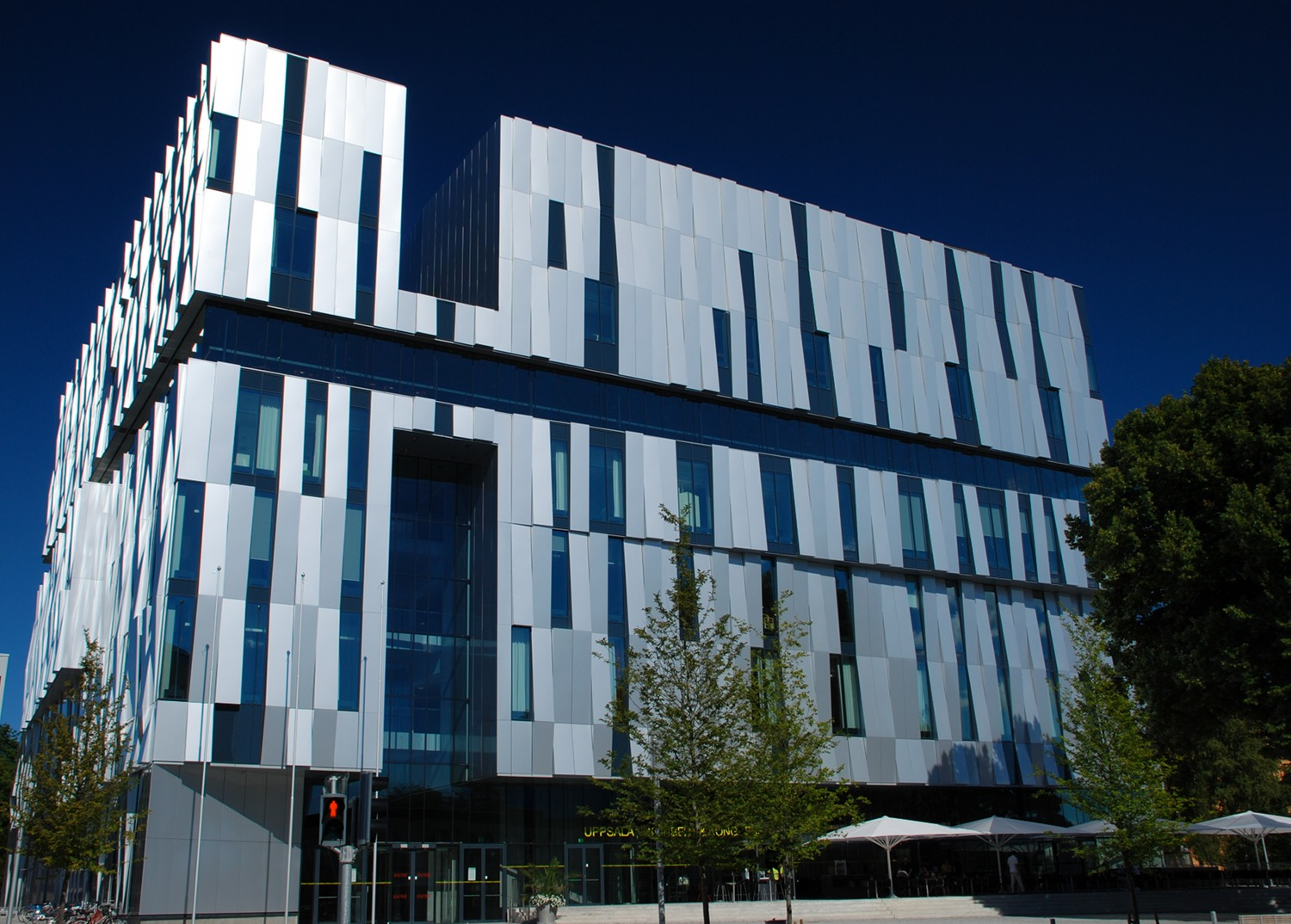

Uppsala Konsert & Kongress (UKK), popularly referred to as Musikens hus (House of music) is a concert hall and convention centre in Uppsala, Sweden. The official inauguration of the building took place on Saturday, 1 September 2007.

== Awards ==
In 2007, Uppsala Konsert & Kongress was awarded a gold medal at the Biennale in Miami Beach. The class that the building was in, the class of large public buildings, can be said to cover what is generally regarded as "monuments".

== Criticisms and popular opinion ==
The construction project was preceded by a long and committed political debate in the municipality of Uppsala. Plans for a concert hall in Uppsala had been discussed intermittently since 1912, but the final decision to start the construction was not taken until 2004.

The building has been somewhat controversial, and its exterior, interior, location and function as a concert hall have all been criticised. However, a survey conducted in the autumn of 2010, indicates that one third of the 1360 respondents considered the building to be an important symbol for Uppsala, while 36% believed that it will become such a symbol in future.

== See also ==
- Volt Festival
