= Walerud =

Walerud is a surname. Notable people with the surname include:

- Caroline Walerud (born 1990/91), Swedish entrepreneur
- Jane Walerud (born 1961), Sweden-based entrepreneur
