= Heart Aerospace =

Hybrid-electric aircraft manufacturer

- Type: Private
- Industry: Aerospace manufacturing
- Founded: 2018; 8 years ago in Gothenburg, Sweden
- Founder: Anders Forslund; Klara Forslund
- Headquarters: Los Angeles, United States
- Key people: Anders Forslund (Chairman, Co-Founder & CEO); Ben Stabler (CTO)
- Number of employees: 126 (2023)
- Website: heartaerospace.com

Heart Aerospace is an American aerospace manufacturer developing hybrid-electric regional aircraft. The company was founded in 2018 by Anders and Klara Forslund in Gothenburg, Sweden, and initially developed the 19-seat ES-19 all-electric aircraft concept before replacing it in 2022 with the 30-seat ES-30 hybrid-electric regional airliner. In 2024, Heart Aerospace unveiled the Heart X1 full-scale demonstrator for the ES-30 program. The company moved its headquarters and operations to Los Angeles, California, in 2025.

== History ==
Heart Aerospace was established in Gothenburg, Sweden, in 2018 by Anders and Klara Forslund, originally as a government-sponsored project. They first set up operations at Säve Airport near Gothenburg.

The company participated in the 2019 Y Combinator's Winter Batch and subsequently unveiled its design for the ES-19 all‑electric regional aircraft. In January 2022, Heart Aerospace conducted a successful test flight with a one-fifth-scale model of its ES-19 airplane. In September 2022, the company changed direction and unveiled the ES-30, which was a slightly larger hybrid-electric regional airliner. The company also announced an industry advisory board with members representing airlines, leasing companies, and airports. In 2024, Heart Aerospace unveiled the Heart X1, its first full-scale demonstrator aircraft, as a development tool for the ES-30. The company also announced plans for its first test flight at Plattsburgh International Airport followed by the X2 prototype. In September 2024, Heart Aerospace filed two EU design applications and one patent application for its integrated nacelle design.

In May 2024, Heart Aerospace announced the establishment of a new research and development hub in Los Angeles focusing on its hybrid-electric propulsion system, and the Forslunds moved there to oversee operations. The company subsequently closed its Swedish operations in 2025 and moved its headquarters to Los Angeles.

In 2024, Heart Aerospace unveiled its first full-scale demonstrator aircraft, the Heart X1 (Heart Experimental 1). Ground testing was performed in Gothenburg in 2024, with flight testing planned at Plattsburgh Airport in New York. The X1's maiden flight took place on 12th August 2026, lasting 27 minutes.

=== Order summary ===
Date	Customer	Orders	Options	Notes
13 July 2021	United Airlines	100	50	Originally ordered ES-19, later reconfirmed for ES-30
13 July 2021	Mesa Airlines	100	50	Originally ordered ES-19, later reconfirmed for ES-30
15 September 2022	Air Canada	30	–	
16 September 2022	Icelandair	Undisclosed		
10 May 2023	Rockton	20	20	Aircraft leasing company
23 September 2026	JSX	50	50	Deposit-backed purchase agreement, replacing a 2023 letter of intent for the ES-30; includes purchase rights for 50 additional aircraft.
Totals		300	170	

The company also has letters of intent (non-firm orders) for a further 191 airplanes from Braathens Regional Airlines, Loganair, Icelandair, JSX, Scandinavian Airlines, Sounds Air, and Sevenair Air Services.

== Aircraft ==
=== ES-19 ===
Heart Aerospace’s first design, the ES-19, was unveiled in 2020 following its participation in the 2019 Y Combinator's Winter Batch. The ES‑19 was a 19‑seat, all‑electric regional aircraft concept designed for short-haul routes of approximately 400 kilometres (250 mi). The company conducted a successful test flight with a one-fifth-scale model of the plane in January 2022 that lasted four and a half minutes with a maximum speed of 93 mph. In June 2022, the company changed its application to a heavier weight category and EASA CS-25 certification which would not require an exemption from the European Union Aviation Safety Agency for being overweight. This design was then superseded in September 2022 by the ES-30.

=== ES-30 ===
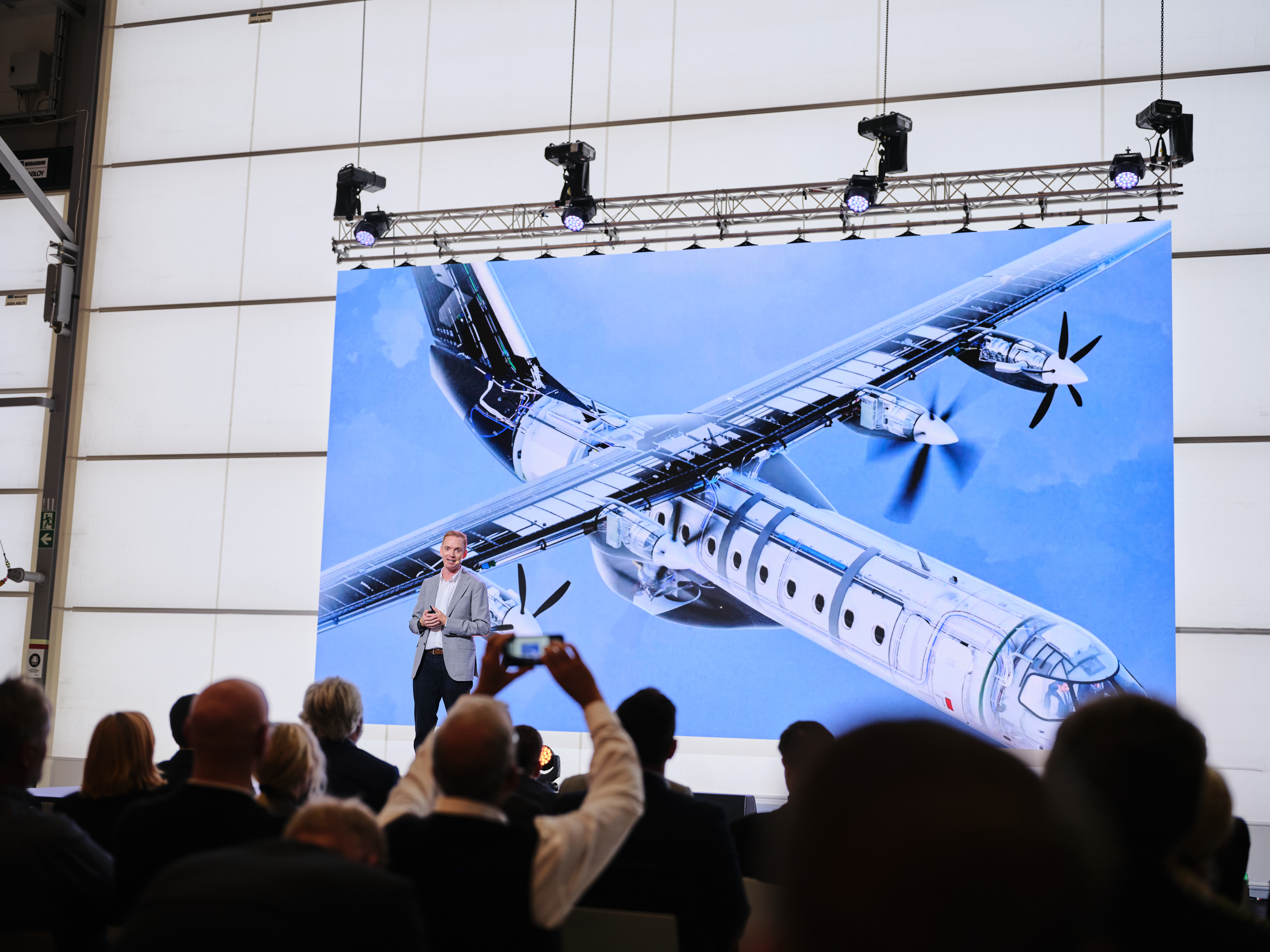
Heart Aerospace founder and CEO Anders Forslund showcases a cutaway rendering of the ES-30 hybrid-electric regional aircraft and its propulsion system in 2024.

The ES-30 is a 30-seat hybrid-electric regional airliner, designed for short-haul routes. It is projected to have an electric-only range of 200 kilometres (110 nautical miles) and a hybrid-electric range of 400 km (220 nmi), capable of zero carbon dioxide emissions on short routes. With a reduced passenger load of 25, a range of 800 km (430 nmi) may be achievable.

The ES-30’s design includes batteries for shorter routes and two turboprop engines to extend flight range. It also features Heart Aerospace’s design for an engine nacelle integrated into the wing which will allow the plane to fly at lower speeds and operate on shorter runways. The company aims to achieve type certification for the ES-30 by the end of the 2020s. The plane is projected to have a per-seat operating cost similar to a 50-person propeller plane.

=== Experimental planes ===
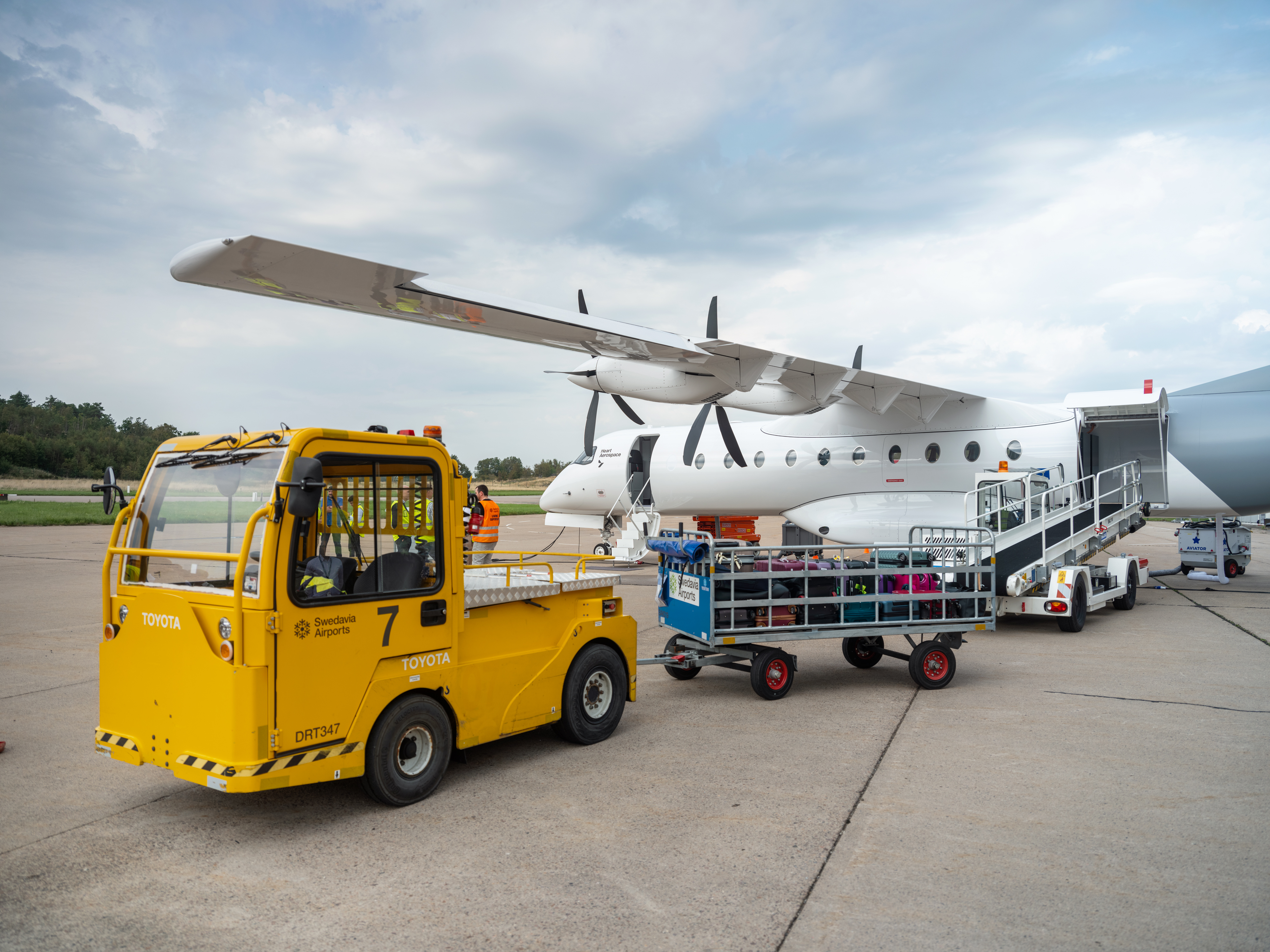
Ground crew conducts a turnaround test of Heart Aerospace’s X1 prototype, loading baggage and preparing the aircraft for simulated flight in September 2024.

Heart Aerospace's first full-scale demonstrator aircraft was the Heart X1 (Heart Experimental 1). The electrical aircraft has a 105 ft wingspan. Development of the X1 was partially funded by grants from Swedish innovation agency Vinnova. On August 12th 2026, the Heart X1 demonstrator took off and flew 8 miles using only $5 worth of electricity at local pricing, lifted entirely by the power of 4 battery-powered propellers. Some called it the largest battery-electric plane (as opposed to series hybrid, solar-electric, and fuel cell aircraft).

Following the X1 program, Heart Aerospace plans to construct a pre-production prototype, the Heart X2. The X2 will incorporate design refinements based on the X1's operational experience and will feature the company’s hybrid propulsion system, which is slated for a hybrid-electric flight demonstration in 2026.

== Financing ==
In the spring of 2019, after participating in Y Combinator, Heart Aerospace raised US$2.1 million in seed funding led by EQT Ventures, the Norrsken Foundation, and Chris Sacca’s Lowercarbon Capital. By March 2021, the company documented interest in its concept airplane, the ES-19, from Finnair, the Nordic Network for Electric Aviation, and airlines in New Zealand, Canada, the US, and the UK.

The company secured $35 million in Series A funding in July 2021, led by Bill Gates' Breakthrough Energy Ventures, United Airlines Ventures, and Mesa Air Group, with participation from existing seed investors EQT Ventures and Lowercarbon Capital. At that time, United Airlines Ventures and Mesa Air Group also announced an order of up to 200 ES-19 planes.

In September 2022, Air Canada and Saab each invested $5 million in Heart Aerospace. Concurrently, Air Canada placed a purchase order for 30 ES-30 aircraft. Prior orders for the ES-19 from United and Mesa Air Group were converted to the ES-30. The company also confirmed letters of intent and orders from Nordic operators like SAS AB, Braathens Regional Aviation, Icelandair, up to 40 planes for Rockton Sustainable Aviation, and an order from Sounds Air in New Zealand. By the end of 2022, Heart Aerospace had secured 230 orders for the ES-30.

In February 2024, Heart Aerospace raised a total of $107 million in Series B funding, increasing its total capital raised to $145 million. Investors included the European Innovation Council Fund and Sagitta Ventures, a Danish early-stage investment firm, as well as some returning investors like Air Canada, Breakthrough Energy Ventures, EQT Ventures, Lowercarbon Capital, Norrsken VC, United Airlines, and Y Combinator.

In 2024, the Federal Aviation Administration selected Heart Aerospace to receive a $4.1 million FAST grant to support the design of hybrid engine control systems.

Heart Aerospace raised $40 million from an existing investor in the spring of 2025. By the fall of 2025, the company had raised more than $185 million in venture funding. It also had 250 orders for the ES-30, and options or purchase rights for an additional 120 planes.
