= Katedralskolan, Uppsala =

Gymnasium in Sweden

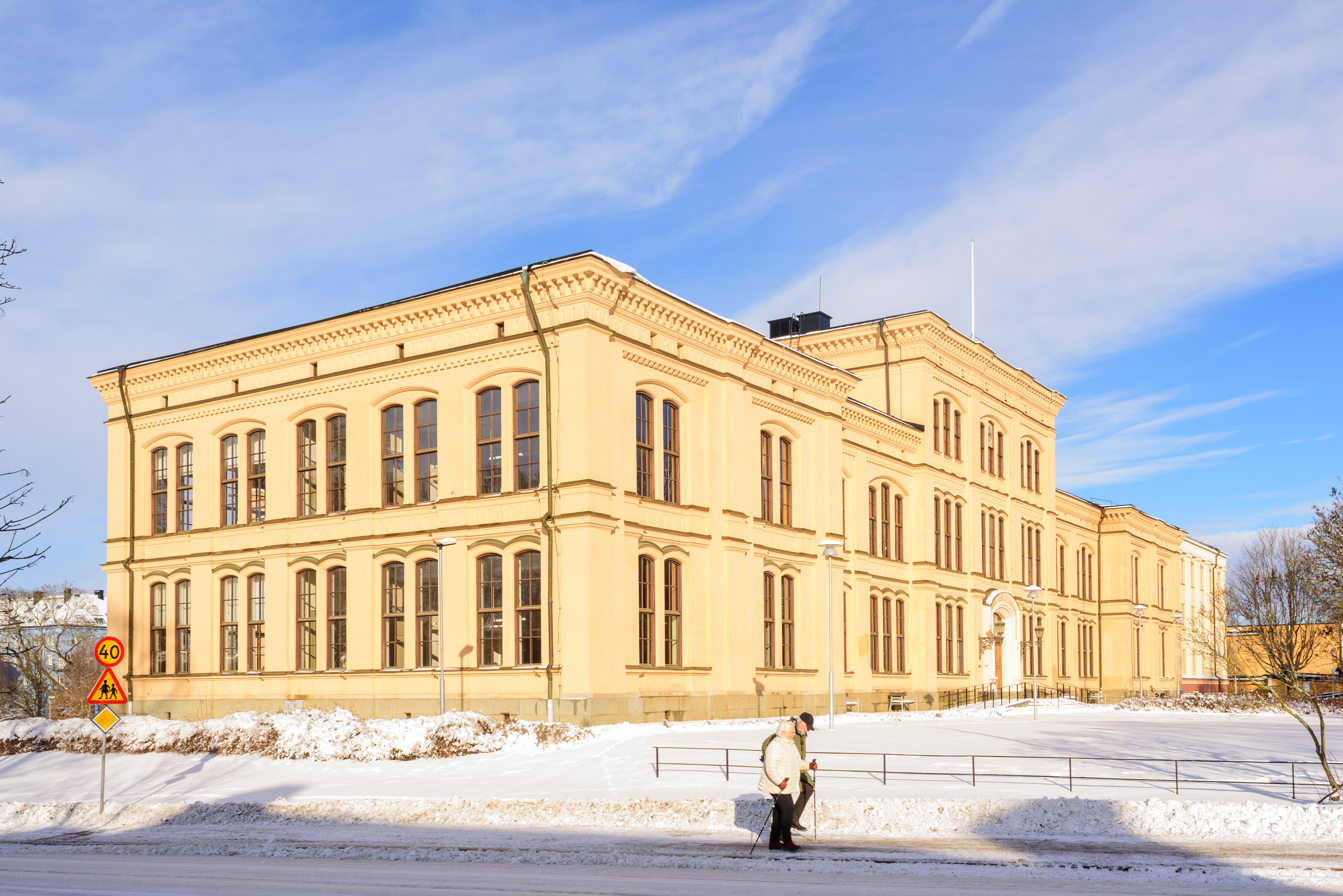
- The main building

Location
- Skolgatan 2 Uppsala, Uppsala County, 753 12; Sweden
- Coordinates: 59°51′31″N 17°38′20″E

Information
- Other names: Katte
- Type: Public
- Established: 1246; 780 years ago
- Rector: Andreas Widmark
- Grades: 10–12
- Enrollment: 1410
- Language: Main: Swedish, English (IB Diploma Programme); Other: Spanish, French, German
- Colour
- Alumni: See #Notable alumni
- Nobel laureates: Svante Arrhenius (chemistry); Kai Siegbahn (physics); Dag Hammarskjöld (peace)
- Website: www.katedral.se (in Swedish)

Katedralskolan (Swedish; Cathedral School in English; colloquially Katte; formerly Uppsala Högre Allmänna Läroverket, or Higher-level Public Education) is a public gymnasium in Uppsala, Sweden. The school was, according to tradition, established in 1246. It is the oldest educational institution in Uppsala, and one of the oldest in Sweden.

== History ==
A school administered by Uppsala Cathedral existed before the year 1300; originally, this school was a seminary for clergy and other church functionaries. In 1509, Gustav Eriksson, who would later become King Gustav I (also known as Gustavus Vasa), became a student at the school, according to Peder Svart's chronicle. Allegedly, he tired of his studies and left the school, having driven his dagger through a book and cursed his teacher.

From the late Middle Ages to the mid-19th century, education at the school focused on the three subjects that formed the trivium: grammar, dialectics and rhetoric. In 1865, the first student degrees were conferred on students at the school. By this time, the school was called Högre allmänna läroverket, a name it kept until 1972. In 1930, the first female students were accepted.

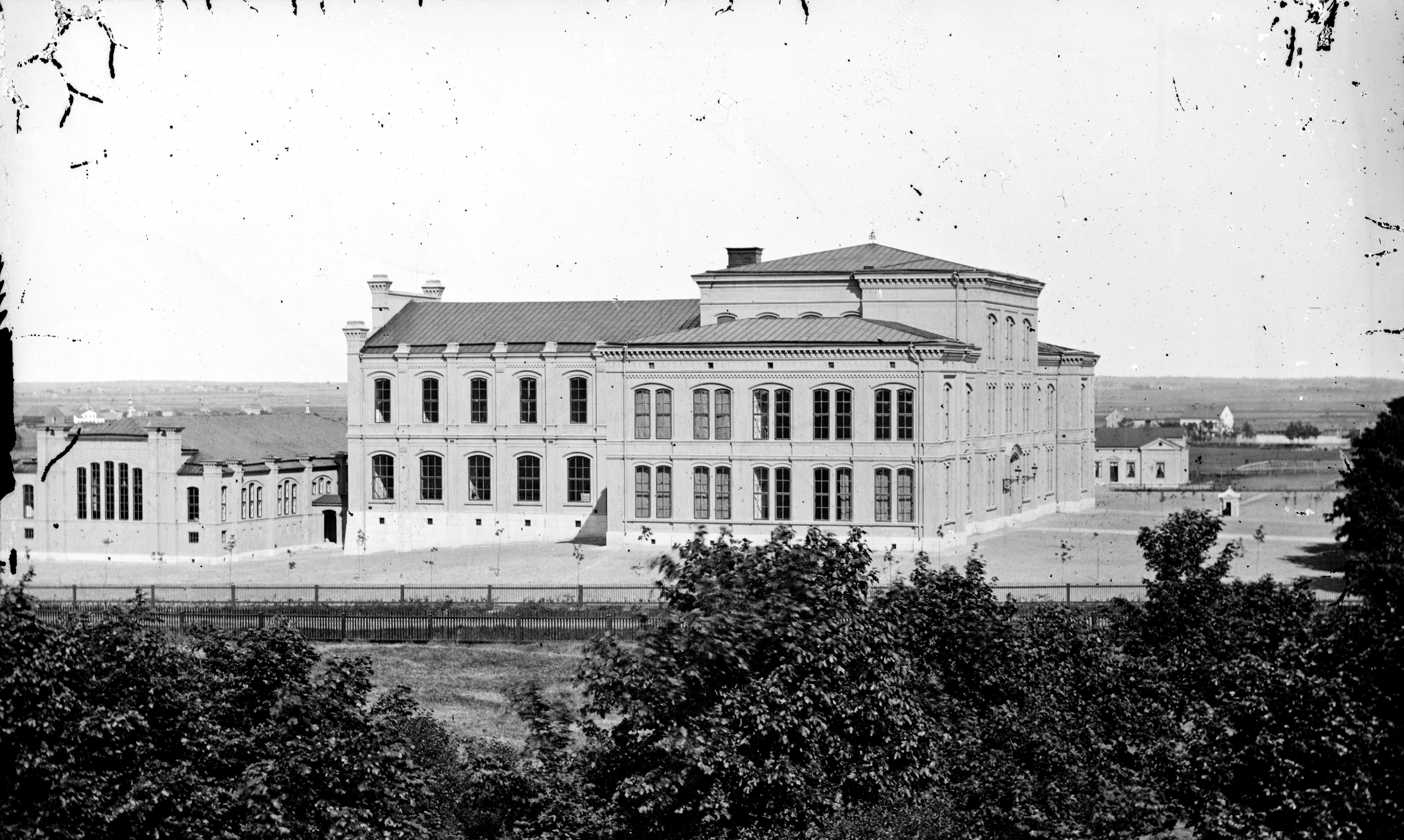
Katedralskolan's main building photographed sometime before 1914

Until 1869, the school was located in various locations next to the cathedral, but in that year, it moved to its current building designed by the architect Fredrik Wilhelm Scholander. Since then, several new buildings have been added to the original.

== Present day ==
Today, Katedralskolan is a gymnasium with around 1200 students. Traditionally, Katedralskolan has focused on theoretical education in the humanities and natural sciences, but it also offers programmes in subjects such as child care.

The school offers the International Baccalaureate Diploma Programme, as well as advanced programmes in German, French, and Spanish.

School coat of arms

There are a number of student societies, the oldest still existing one being the young scientists' society known as Matematisk-naturvetenskapliga föreningen (or MNF), founded in 1899.

== Gallery ==
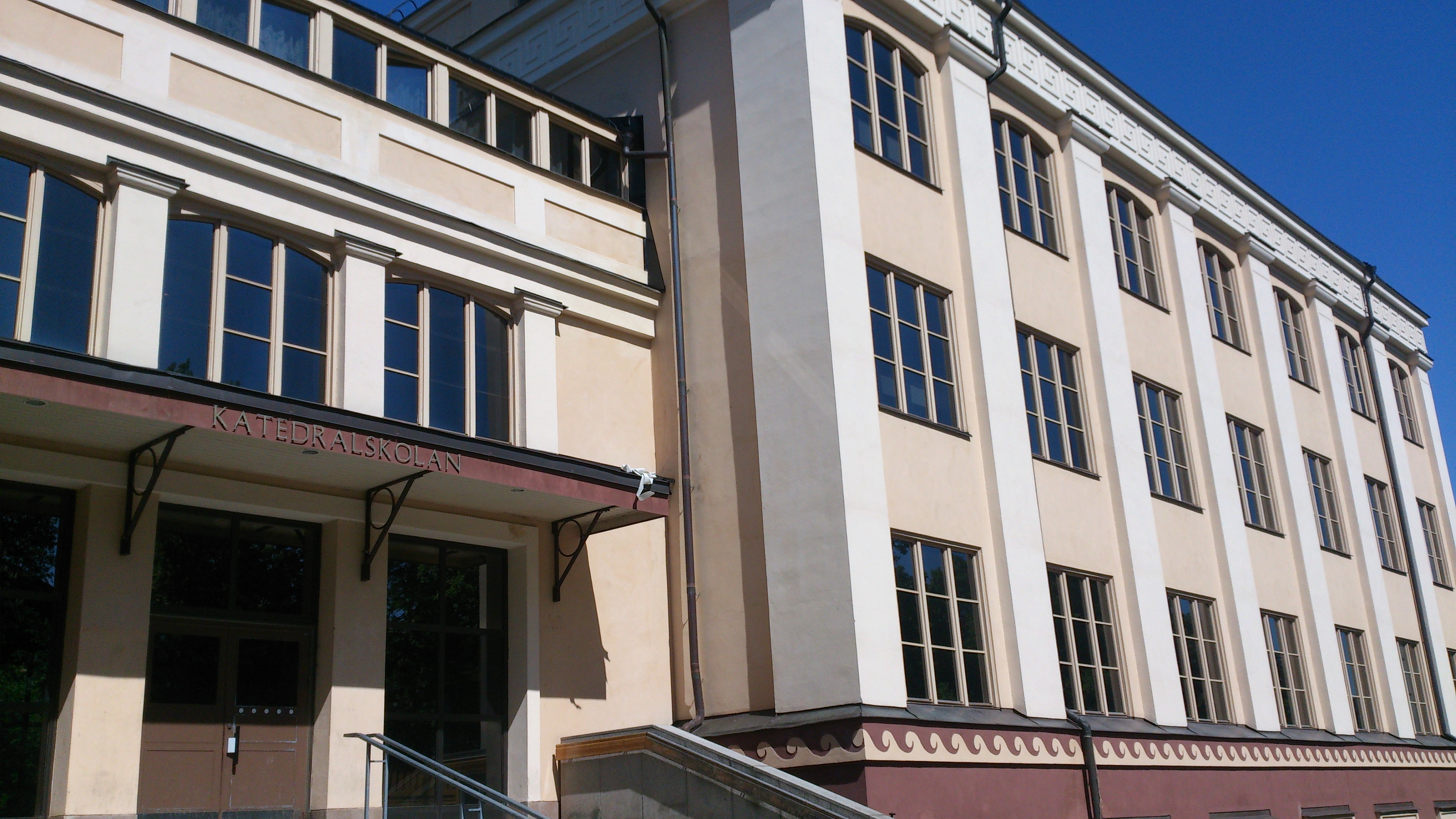
The institution building

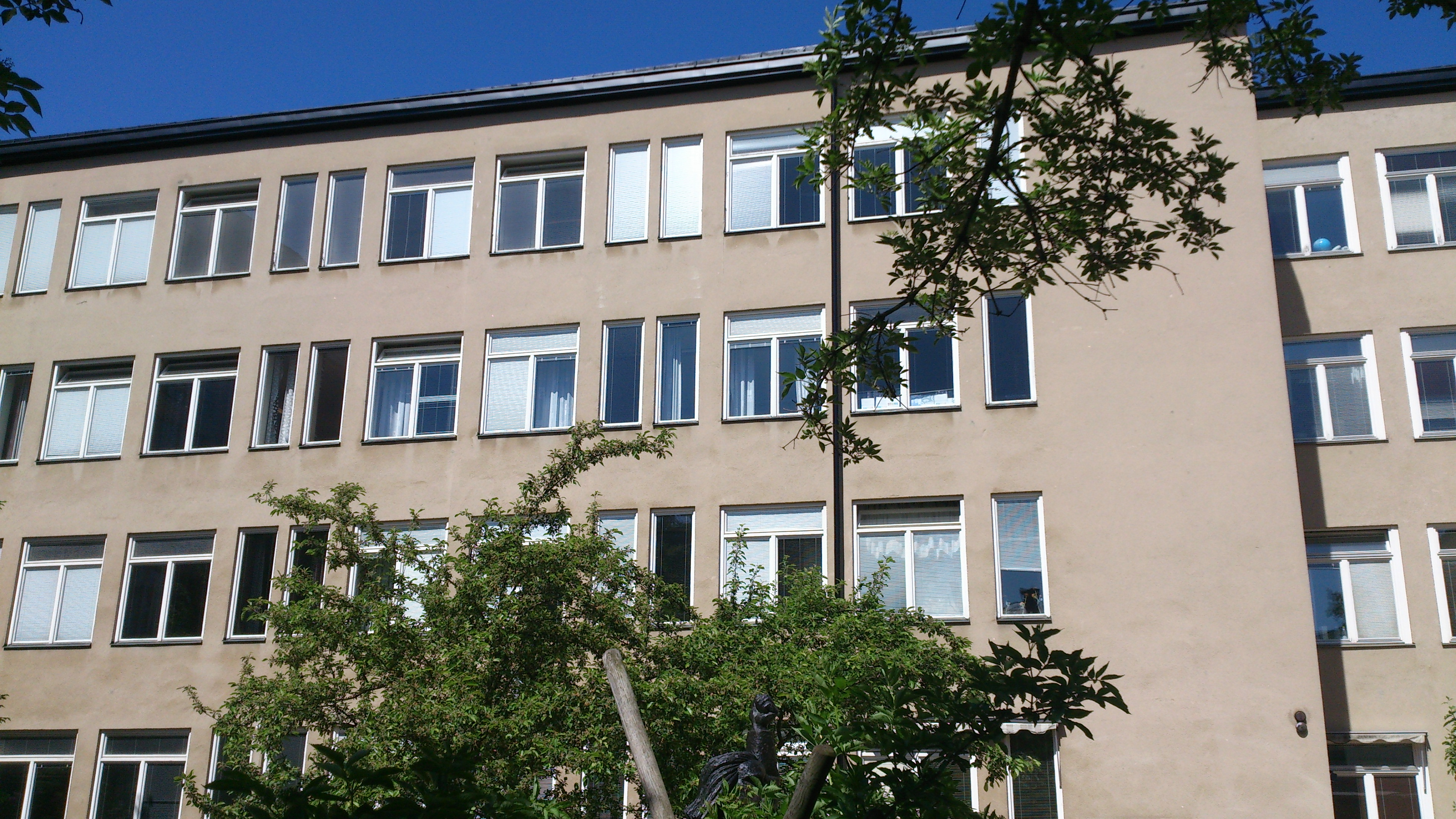
The annexe

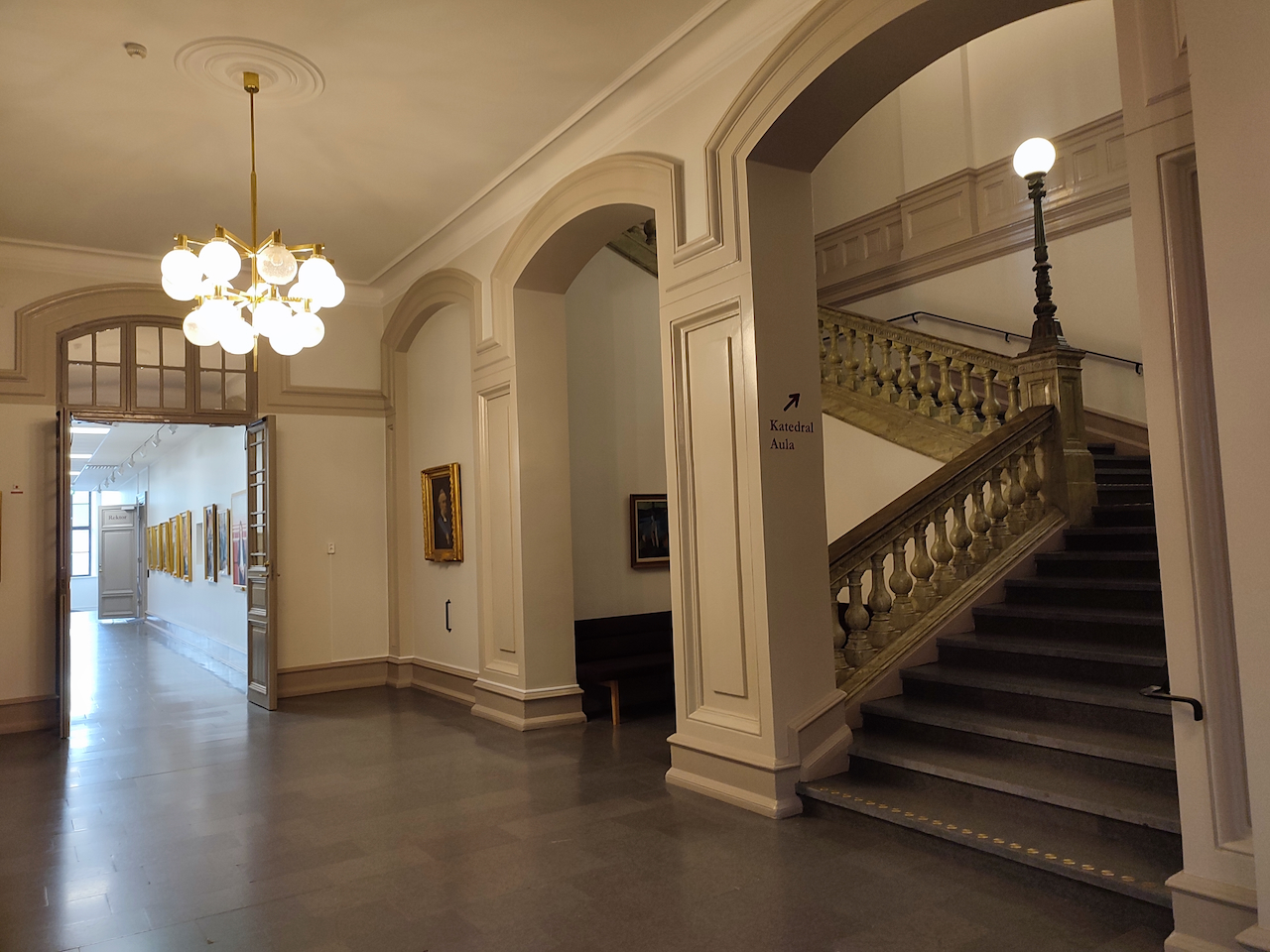
Bottom of the stairs leading to the auditorium

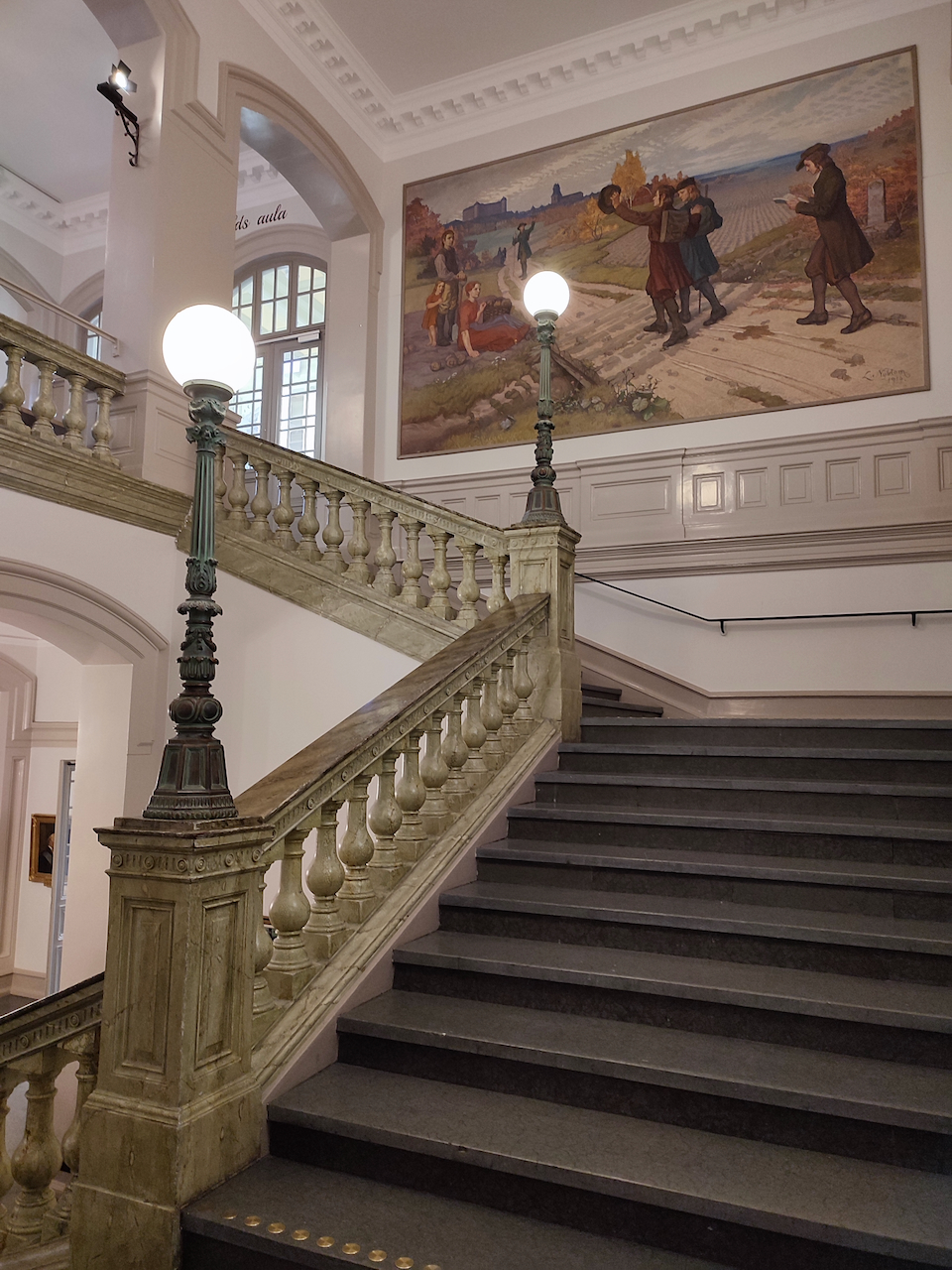
Stairs leading to the auditorium

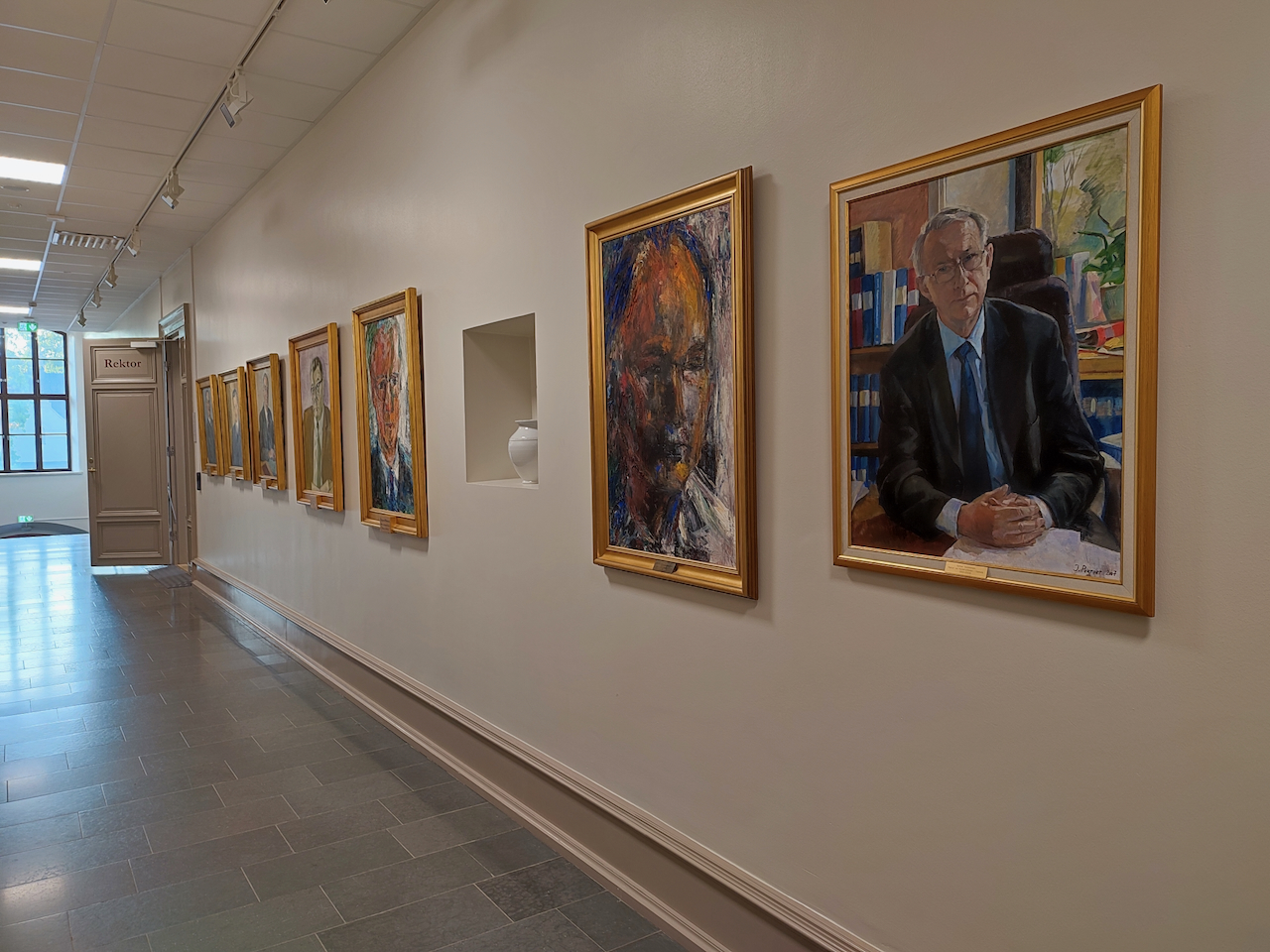
Corridor with former principals

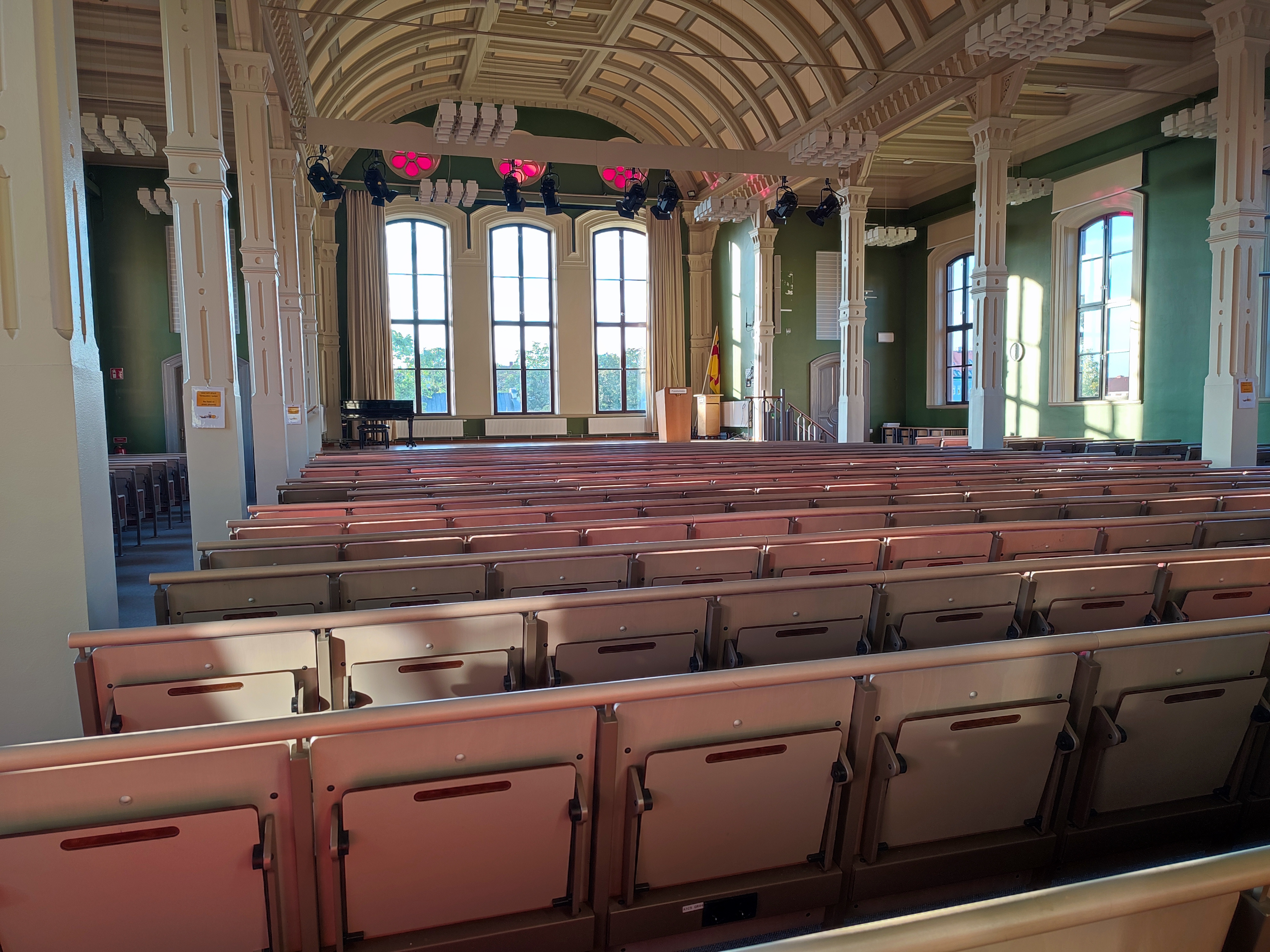
Auditorium (403 seats)

== Notable alumni ==
- Gustav I (Gustav Vasa), King of Sweden 1523–1560
- Svante Arrhenius, 1903 Nobel laureate in Chemistry
- Kai Siegbahn, 1981 Nobel laureate in Physics
- Dag Hammarskjöld, Secretary-General of the United Nations 1953–1961 and 1961 Nobel laureate in Peace
- Magdalena Andersson, first female Prime Minister of Sweden 2021–2022
- Erik Gustaf Boström (1842–1907), Prime Minister of Sweden 1891–1900 and 1902–1905
- Hans Blix, former head of the International Atomic Energy Agency, Foreign Minister of Sweden 1978–1979
- Anders Wall, businessman, founder and owner of Beijerinvest
- Ebba Busch, leader of the Christian Democrats and Deputy Prime Minister of Sweden 2022–present
- Åke Lindemalm, Swedish Navy admiral
- Hans Rosling, Swedish physician and academic, co-founder of the Gapminder Foundation
- Sebastian Siemiatkowski, Swedish entrepreneur and co-founder of Klarna
- Niklas Zennström, Swedish entrepreneur, billionaire, and co-founder of Skype

== See also ==
- List of oldest schools
