= Niklas Adalberth =

Swedish entrepreneur and philanthropist

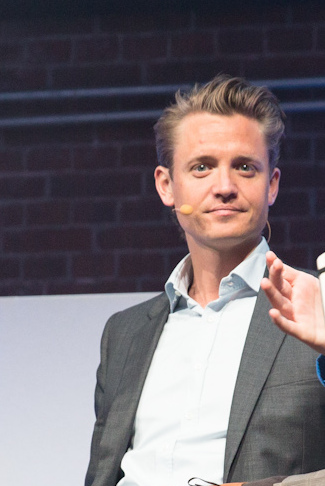
- Adalberth at a conference in 2013
- Born: Gustav Erik Niklas Adalberth; October 19, 1981 (age 44); Gottsunda Parish, Uppsala, Sweden
- Education: Stockholm School of Economics
- Occupation: Entrepreneur
- Known for: Founder, Norrsken Foundation, co-founder Klarna
- Website: norrsken.org

Gustav Erik Niklas Adalberth (born 1981) is a Swedish entrepreneur and philanthropist, known as a co-founder of Klarna and the founder of Norrsken Foundation, a social impact organization founded in 2016.

== Biography ==
Adalberth was born and raised in Gottsunda Parish, Uppsala, Sweden.

During junior high school, he made money by forging identification cards and government coupons before he was discovered.

He was an exchange student in Connecticut for a year. Before starting his studies, he traveled and worked in Switzerland, among other places. He graduated from the Stockholm School of Economics, where with his childhood friends Sebastian Siemiatkowski and Victor Jacobsson, he founded the finance company Klarna in 2005. He left his operational role at Klarna in 2015 and subsequently founded the Norrsken Foundation.

== Norrsken Foundation ==
In June 2016, Adalberth founded the Norrsken foundation. At the beginning of 2017, Norrsken opened the doors to the Norrsken House office hotel at Birger Jarlsgatan in central Stockholm, where over 400 entrepreneurs with a focus on social entrepreneurship work today. In June 2019, Norrsken announced the opening of a second Norrsken House in Kigali, Rwanda, with the goal of becoming East Africa's largest hub for entrepreneurship. In June 2020, it was announced that the major banks Nordea and SEB as well as the EU, through the European Investment Fund EIF, chose to invest in Norrsken's venture capital fund Norrsken VC. Previous investors in Norrsken VC include the Swedish state's Saminvest and the H&M family Perssons Ramsbury Invest.
