= Norrsken Foundation =

Swedish non-profit organization

- Formation: 30 June 2016; 10 years ago
- Founder: Niklas Adalberth
- Founded at: Stockholm, Sweden
- Type: Nonprofit organization, Impact investor
- Legal status: Foundation
- Headquarters: Stockholm, Sweden
- CEO: Sara Kappelmark, Funda Sezgi
- Website: norrskenfoundation.org

Norrsken Foundation is a non-profit, non-religious and non-partisan foundation dedicated to helping entrepreneurs solve the world's greatest challenges, such as poverty, famine, mental health, pollution and climate change. It has raised several venture capital funds, manages an accelerator program for early-stage startups and operates Norrsken House hubs in Stockholm, Sweden; Kigali, Rwanda; Brussels, Belgium; Amsterdam, the Netherlands and Barcelona, Spain. Norrsken was created by Niklas Adalberth, one of the founders of the fintech company Klarna.

== History ==
Norrsken Foundation was created in June 2016 by Klarna founder Niklas Adalberth, who contributed $20 million to the launch. In December 2017 Adalberth committed an additional $62 million to Norrsken Foundation. That same year, a co-working space of 2400 square meters named Norrsken House was opened in a repurposed tram depot in Stockholm. In 2026, Norrsken Houses in Stockholm, Sweden, Kigali, Rwanda, Brussels, Belgium, Amsterdam, the Netherlands and Barcelona, Spain, hosted more than 3000 members.

== Investments ==
After the initial launch in 2016, the co-founders of Mojang, King and Daniel Wellington seeded a $34 million fund. Investments in the companies hosted by the foundation range from $100,000 to $1 million.

In 2019, Norrsken closed a new investment fund, Norrsken VC, that will invest 100 million euros in new companies focused on sustainability. In 2020 the EU invested in the Norrsken fund through the European Investment Fund (EIF), along with Nordic banks Nordea and SEB.

In 2021, Norrsken closed a $200 million Africa-focused investment fund, Norrsken 22, aimed at backing a new generation of African tech unicorns. That same year, Norrsken launched an Accelerator programme, investing in 20 early-stage startups each year.

In 2024, Norrsken VC closed its second fund at 320 million euro, making it Europe's largest early-stage generalist impact fund.

By end of 2024, Norrsken had raised over 750mEur and backed more than 150 startups via its various funds.

== Co-working spaces ==
Norrsken operates Norrsken Houses in Stockholm, Sweden, Barcelona, Spain, Brussels, Belgium and Amsterdam, the Netherlands. Norrsken Houses are co-working spaces for entrepreneurs trying to solve social problems.

In 2019, Norrsken announced the construction of Norrsken House East Africa, a co-working space for entrepreneurs in Kigali, Rwanda. Norrsken House Kigali opened to the public in December 2021. The Kigali hub spans 12000 square meters and is currently home to support up to 1,300+ members. It offers facilities such as private offices, meeting rooms, and event spaces, catering to startups and ventures focused on innovation and social impact across Africa. The Kigali hub has partnered with local and international organizations to host programs and events aimed at fostering entrepreneurship and driving sustainable growth in the region. It also hosts a number of community events each month such as their flagship Founder's Friday Pitch event. In October 2023, Norrsken opened Norrsken House Barcelona, Europe's biggest hub for tech and impact.

== See also ==
- Effective altruism
