= Jane Walerud =

Swedish entrepreneur and investor

- Born: Jane Christine Walerud Boreta; 13 November 1961 (age 64); United States
- Education: Stanford University
- Occupations: Entrepreneur, angel investor
- Known for: Co-founding Bluetail and Teclo Networks; Early investor in Klarna
- Children: Caroline Walerud
- Awards: IVA Gold Medal (2017); King's Medal (2019)

Jane Christine Walerud Boreta (born 13 November 1961) is a Sweden-based entrepreneur and investor. She has been involved in over 15 startups since the early 2000s, including Klarna, Bluetail, Tobii Technology, Teclo Networks, and GraphMaTech. She is member of The Swedish Government Innovation Council.

== Early life ==
Walerud was born in the US and moved to Sweden when she was 20 years old after meeting her husband, Bengt. She studied Cognitive Psychology and Computer Science at Stanford University. Jane and Bengt Walerud have a daughter, Caroline, who is also a private investor and entrepreneur.

== Career ==
Walerud worked as a Sales Manager at Erlang Systems in 1997. She left in 1998 to co-found Bluetail, a company which developed all of its products in Erlang. It was then sold for $152 million to Alteon Networks.

In 2004, she met Sebastian Siemiatkowski, founder of Klarna and invested €60,000 for 10% of the company. She also introduced the founders to a team of programmers who helped them build their platform in exchange for 37% shares.

Walerud started Teclo Networks with a new team in 2010. They developed a technology to increase the speed of mobile broadband. After six years, she and her other co-founders sold Teclo Networks to Sandvine.

In 2016, Walerud invested in a real time digital coach for runners and cross-country skiers called Racefox. She invested 6 million SEK in the company and became one of the board members. In 2018, she invested in a functionalized graphene company named Graphmatech.

She also formed her own venture company called Walerud Ventures together with her husband, Bengt, and their daughter, Caroline. They join pre-seed and seed companies focusing on high technology such as artificial intelligence, synthetic biology, and durability.

== Awards ==
In 2015, Jane was elected into SUP46s Swedish Startup Hall of Fame.

In 2017 she was awarded a gold medal by the Royal Swedish Academy of Engineering Sciences.

Sweden's Business Week named her one of the most powerful women in Sweden in 2017, 2018, 2019, and 2020.

In 2019, she was awarded H.M. The King's Medal for her significant efforts in Swedish business.
