= Sebastian Siemiatkowski =

Swedish entrepreneur (born 1981)

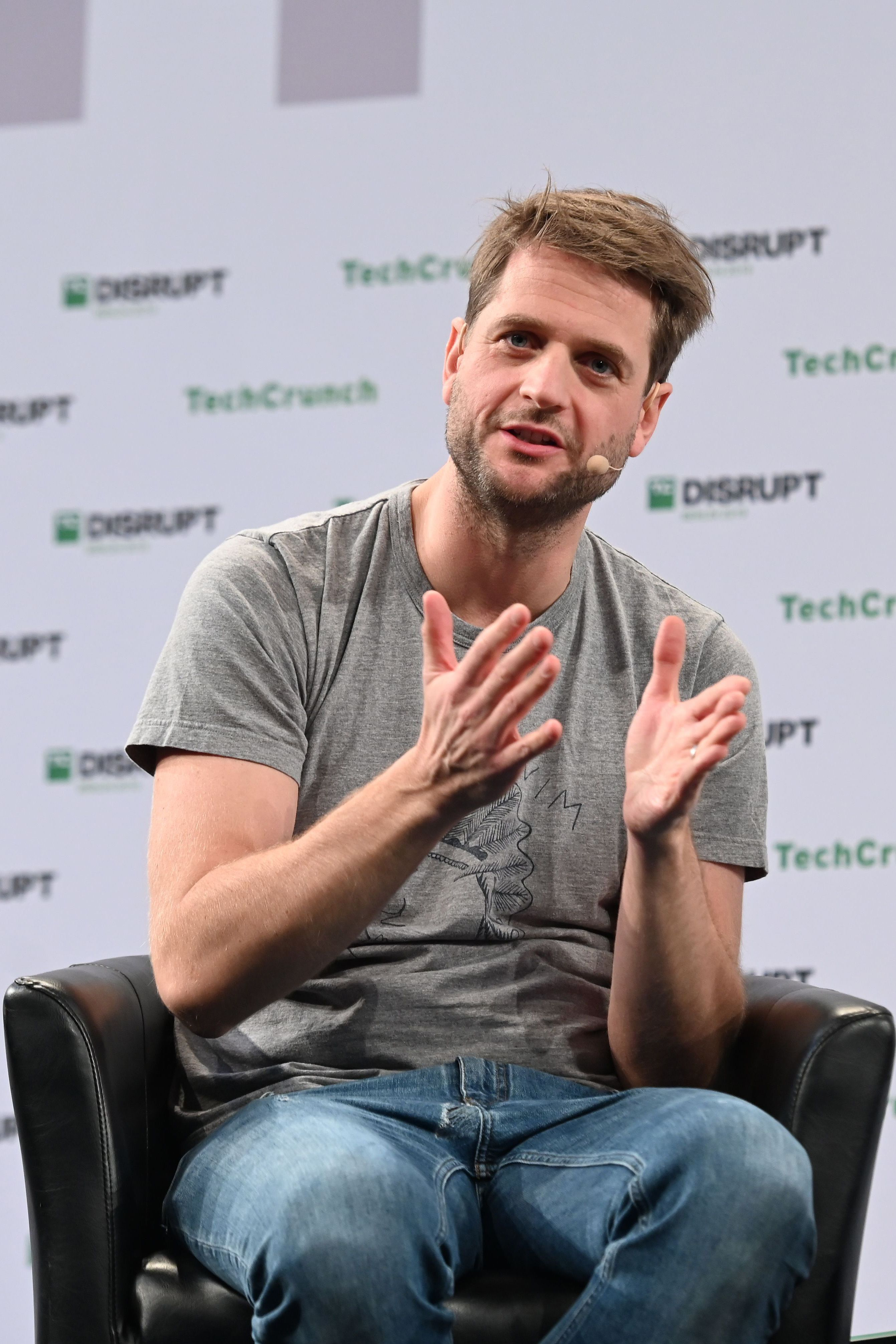
- Siemiatkowski in 2019
- Born: 3 October 1981 (age 44); Sweden
- Education: Stockholm School of Economics
- Occupation: CEO of Klarna

Sebastian Siemiatkowski (Polish spelling Sebastian Siemiątkowski; born 3 October 1981) is a Swedish entrepreneur who is the co-founder and chief executive officer of fintech company Klarna. In 2022, his net worth was estimated at $3.2 billion as Klarna's valuation increased although he is (as of 2025) no longer a billionaire.

== Early life & education ==
Siemiatkowski's parents and his eldest sister moved from their native Poland to Uppsala, Sweden in 1980. Siemiatkowski was born the year after on October 3, 1981. Siemiatkowski has said in interviews that he considers himself as a second generation immigrant, due to his Polish heritage.

He attended high school at Katedralskolan, Uppsala. He holds a master's degree from the Stockholm School of Economics.

His early influences were Richard Branson and Ingvar Kamprad, founder of IKEA. Siemiatkowski credits the Swedish digital policy of subsidizing the ownership of computers for his success because it allowed his family to acquire their first computer.

== Career ==
Siemiatkowski started building Klarna at age 23, while on a sabbatical from the Stockholm School of Economics. He worked in sales offering accounts receivable services to small businesses, and noticed significant and regular challenges when processing with e-commerce payments. He co-founded the company with Niklas Adalberth and Victor Jacobsson in 2005. Siemiatkowski had met one of his co-founders when working at Burger King. In 2021, he was minted as a billionaire as Klarna's valuation increased to $31 billion.

In 2022, Klarna announced a round of redundancies in response to a global economic slowdown. Departing employees were asked if they wanted to join a voluntary initiative to share their availability on platforms like LinkedIn. Those who agreed to the initiative had their details shared by Klarna and also Siemiatkowski. By sharing the list, Siemiatkowski subsequently received both praise and criticism in the media.

The Swedish Financial Sector Union expressed regret to have learnt about the job cuts from the media rather than being consulted beforehand and sued the company over the layoffs. In December 2024, he stated that the company would not increase headcount because "AI can do all of the jobs that we humans do. It’s just a question of how we apply it and use it”.

Klarna listed on the New York Stock Exchange in September 2025 at a valuation of $19 billion. At the time, it was the largest IPO of the year on the NYSE.

== Personal life ==
Siemiatkowski married Nina, a marketing executive he first met while attending the Stockholm School of Economics, in 2014. She is the founder of a digital platform to connect donors with local nonprofits and played a key role in identifying a marketing agency that created Klarna's branding. They have three children and live in Stockholm.
