= Caroline Walerud =

Swedish entrepreneur

- Born: 1990 or 1991 (age 35–36)
- Citizenship: Sweden
- Education: University of Cambridge
- Known for: Co-founder, Volumental
- Website: LinkedIn profile

Caroline Walerud (born 1990 or 1991) is a Swedish entrepreneur and one of the co-founders of Volumental, a company that developed a cloud-based, 3D-scanning technology to create models to customize products and services.

== Career ==
Walerud co-founded Volumental in 2012 together with three computer vision experts. The company developed a software that uses depth cameras like Microsoft's Kinect or Intel's RealSense to take a 3D-image of feet to get accurate measurements for shoes. In January 2016, Walerud stepped down as Volumental's CEO and took the role of Executive Chairman.

Walerud is also a partner at Walerud Ventures, a deep-tech investment company which focuses on early stage green tech startups together with her parents, Jane and Bengt.

== Awards ==
Caroline was named No. 1 Swedish Supertalent of the Year in December 2013.

In 2016, she became a member of the first Forbes 30 Under 30 Europe list in the Leaderboard and Retail Section.

In 2017, she was named one of Sweden's most powerful women within technology by the Swedish Business Week.

== Personal life ==
Walerud studied Natural Sciences at the University of Cambridge.
