= Klarna =

Swedish financial technology company

Klarna Group plc
- Type: Public limited company
- Traded as: NYSE: KLAR
- ISIN: GB00BMHVL512
- Industry: Financial technology; Financial services; E-commerce; Digital banking
- Founded: 2005; 21 years ago
- Founders: Sebastian Siemiatkowski; Niklas Adalberth; Victor Jacobsson
- Headquarters: Stockholm, Sweden
- Area served: Worldwide
- Key people: Michael Moritz (Chairman); Sebastian Siemiatkowski (CEO)
- Services: Digital payments; Buy now, pay later; Consumer credit; Payment cards; Savings and banking services; Shopping and marketing services; Merchant checkout services
- Revenue: ▲US$3.5 billion (2025)
- Operating income: ▲US$65 million adjusted operating profit (2025)
- Website: klarna.com

Klarna Group plc is a Swedish financial technology company and digital bank. Founded in 2005 in Stockholm, Sweden, Klarna provides digital payments, short-term consumer credit, cards, banking services and merchant tools for online and in-store commerce. It is listed on the New York Stock Exchange and is best known for buy now, pay later payment products.

Klarna Bank AB, the group's Swedish banking subsidiary, is authorized as a bank and supervised by the Swedish Financial Supervisory Authority. It provides financial services in the European Economic Area under European Union banking rules as well as areas outside the EEA, including in the United States and the United Kingdom, through local subsidiaries. As of 2026, Klarna reported more than 119 million active consumers, more than one million merchants, 3.4 million transactions per day and operations across 26 countries.

== History ==
=== Founding and early years ===
Klarna was founded in 2005 by Sebastian Siemiatkowski, Niklas Adalberth and Victor Jacobsson after the founders developed an idea for simplifying online payments. The company was initially known as Kreditor and was supported by SSE Business Lab, the Stockholm School of Economics' start-up incubator. The early business idea centered around allowing consumers to receive goods before paying by taking on the role of credit and fraud risk for merchants.

Angel investor Jane Walerud became an early backer of the company, offering the founders SEK 600,000 for 10% of the company after seeing the idea presented and later connecting them with developers who helped build the platform. Erlang programming language was utilized in Klarna's early technical architecture, a point associated with Walerud's background at Erlang Systems.

In 2007, Investment AB Öresund invested in the company. Klarna subsequently expanded outside Sweden, first to Norway, Finland and Denmark, and later to Germany and the Netherlands. In 2009, the company changed the Kreditor name to Klarna.

=== Expansion, acquisitions and banking license ===
In 2010, Sequoia Capital invested in Klarna. In 2011, Klarna was listed by The Daily Telegraph among Europe's promising young technology companies. In May 2011, Klarna acquired Analyzd, an Israeli company specializing in online payments, risk management and fraud prevention. Later that year, General Atlantic led a $155 million investment round, joined by DST Global, to accelerate international expansion.

Klarna Checkout was launched in 2012 as an embedded checkout product for online merchants. By 2024, the product had a 40% market share in Sweden and over 20% across the Nordic region before the company sold the business that same year.

In 2013, Klarna acquired German online payments company SOFORT AG, operator of Sofortüberweisung, forming Klarna Group.

Klarna launched in the United States in 2015, which became one of the company's main growth markets. In the same year, Sweden's then Minister for Enterprise and Innovation, Mikael Damberg, described Klarna as one of Sweden's five "unicorn" technology companies, alongside Spotify, Mojang, Skype and King.

In June 2017, Klarna received a full banking license from the Swedish Financial Supervisory Authority. In 2018, the company acquired Close Brothers Retail Finance in the United Kingdom, strengthening its UK retail finance position.

In 2019, Klarna raised $460 million in a funding round that valued the company at $5.5 billion, making it one of Europe's highest valued financial technology companies at the time. In 2020, Ant Financial, the financial affiliate of Alibaba Group, acquired a minority stake in Klarna as part of a partnership with the Swedish company.

=== 2020s ===
In June 2021, a funding round led by SoftBank's Vision Fund 2 valued Klarna at about $46 billion, making it one of the world's most valuable private fintech companies. In July 2021, Klarna acquired APPRL, a Stockholm-based influencer marketing software company, as part of its expansion into retailer marketing services. In the same month, it acquired Stocard for 133 million euros. Stocard is a mobile wallet app used by 70 million active users globally to store loyalty cards, access geo localized drive to store retail media and have a free wallet payment card, which technology was later used to develop Klarna payment card. Stocard features and users migrated later into the Klarna app.

Klarna expanded its card products in 2021 and 2022. It launched a physical Klarna Card in the UK in January 2022 and later launched a card product in the United States, supported by Marqeta. In 2022, it completed the acquisition of PriceRunner, a Swedish price-comparison service, to expand its product discovery, price comparison and review tools.

In July 2022, amid falling technology valuations and rising interest rates, Klarna raised $800 million at a valuation of $6.7 billion, about 85 percent below its 2021 valuation. In 2024, Klarna launched Klarna Plus, a US subscription service priced at $7.99 per month that offered benefits such as waived One Time Card service fees, rewards points and partner discounts.

Klarna confidentially initiated the process for a US initial public offering in 2024 and filed a public registration statement in March 2025. It delayed IPO plans in April 2025 amid market volatility related to US tariff changes, before relaunching the offering later in the year.

In September 2025, Klarna completed its initial public offering in the United States. Its ordinary shares began trading on the New York Stock Exchange on 10 September 2025 under the ticker symbol KLAR. The offering comprised 34,311,274 ordinary shares at $40.00 per share, of which 5,000,000 were sold by Klarna and the remainder by selling shareholders. In November 2025, Klarna announced KlarnaUSD, a US dollar-backed stablecoin intended for everyday and cross-border payments. The company said the token was live on the Tempo blockchain testnet and was expected to launch on Tempo's mainnet in 2026.

In July 2026, Swedish court ordered Google to pay the company $1.97 billion in damages after Klarna won an antitrust case alleging that Google engaged in anticompetitive practices. Klarna’s price-comparison unit, PriceRunner, sued Google in 2022, accusing Google of giving preferential treatment to its own price-comparison service in its search results. The same month, Klarna applied to establish an FDIC-insured bank in Utah, which would be its own American banking subsidiary if approved; a bank charter would expand Klarna's traditional banking products and bring lending and merchant operations in-house, "reducing its dependence on third-party banking partners".

In July 2026 it was announced that Klarna partnered with Apple for the new Apple Upgrade service, which allows eligible customers to lease select Apple devices, with Klarna acting as the financial backer and leasing provider of the program.

In August 2026 Klarna announced the departure of their CFO and CMO in January 2027. The COO already left in April 2026.

== Products and business model ==
Klarna operates a digital payments and commerce network connecting consumers and merchants. Its main product lines include Pay Now, for immediate payments and everyday spending; Pay Later, a short-term zero-interest credit product; and point-of-sale installment financing for larger purchases. Klarna also offers cards, banking and savings features in selected markets, checkout and payment infrastructure for merchants, shopping discovery tools, advertising products and retail marketing services.

Klarna's original model was built around invoice-based payment after delivery. In this model, the consumer could complete a purchase without entering card details and pay after receiving the goods, while Klarna processed the payment and took on part of the merchant's credit and fraud risk. Historically, the company's services included products such as Klarna Invoice, Klarna Account, Klarna Checkout and Klarna Direct; these product names and local implementations varied by country and over time as the company broadened its banking and payment offerings.

The company describes its credit discipline as based on short loan durations and real-time re-underwriting of transactions. In its first-quarter 2026 results, Klarna said it had underwritten about $0.5 trillion over 20 years and that its provisions for credit losses were 0.55% of GMV in Q1 2026, compared with 0.54% in Q1 2025. Its 2025 IPO filing also emphasised proprietary data and automated credit underwriting capabilities derived from transaction data on its network.

In June 2024, Klarna announced the sale of Klarna Checkout to a consortium led by BLQ Invest and described the transaction as part of a refocus on flexible payment methods distributed through multiple payment service providers. In 2025 and 2026, the company highlighted distribution partnerships with payment service providers such as Stripe and Nexi, and said JPMorgan Payments and Worldpay were expected to go live as partners.

== Corporate structure and leadership ==
Klarna Group plc is incorporated in England and Wales, with a registered office at 10 York Road, London. Klarna Bank AB is a Swedish limited liability company and authorised bank supervised by Finansinspektionen; Klarna's UK subsidiary, Klarna Financial Services UK Limited, is authorised and regulated by the Financial Conduct Authority for e-money and consumer credit activities.

The board of directors is chaired by Michael Moritz. Sebastian Siemiatkowski, a co-founder of Klarna, is the chief executive officer. As of 2026, the group management team also included Niclas Neglén as chief financial officer, David Fock as chief product and design officer, Yaron Shaer as chief technology officer, David Sandström as chief marketing officer and David Sykes as chief commercial officer.

Klarna's Swedish banking entity has organisation number 556737-0431 and headquarters at Sveavägen 46 in Stockholm. The company's labour relations became a national issue in Sweden in 2023, when unions Unionen and Sveriges Ingenjörer announced strike action at Klarna's Stockholm headquarters; the strike was called off after Klarna agreed to join the financial-sector employers' organisation BAO and be covered by a collective bargaining agreement from 1 January 2024.

== Financials ==
For the 2025 financial year, Klarna reported gross merchandise volume of $127.9 billion, total revenue of $3.5 billion and adjusted operating profit of $65 million. The company also reported 118 million active consumers and 966,000 merchants.

Selected indicators
Period	Gross merchandise volume	Revenue	Adjusted operating profit	Active consumers	Merchants
2025	$127.9 billion	$3.5 billion	$65 million	118 million	966,000
Q1 2026	$33.7 billion	$1.0 billion	$68 million	119 million	more than 1 million

In the first quarter of 2026, Klarna reported GMV of $33.7 billion, revenue of $1.0 billion, transaction margin dollars of $389 million, operating income of $17 million, adjusted operating profit of $68 million and net income of $1 million. The company also reported that the Klarna Card had reached five million active users across 16 countries and that revenue per employee had reached nearly $1.4 million.

== Regulation and controversies ==
=== Consumer credit regulation ===
Klarna's buy now, pay later products have been subject to regulatory scrutiny in multiple jurisdictions. In the United Kingdom, government and parliamentary documents noted concerns that the rapid growth of interest-free BNPL products could cause consumer detriment, and the Financial Conduct Authority said deferred payment credit would enter FCA regulation from 15 July 2026. In 2022, the FCA also secured contract changes from several BNPL firms, including Klarna, after identifying potentially unfair or unclear terms.

In Sweden, the Swedish Consumer Agency contacted Klarna in 2014 after complaints that customers had received reminder fees and debt collection communications without first receiving an invoice; the agency also examined credit fees connected to partial payments. In Germany, the District Court of Bremerhaven ruled in 2022 that Klarna could not charge a flat €1.20 fee for an email reminder where it had not shown corresponding costs.

=== Advertising and marketing ===
In December 2020, the UK's Advertising Standards Authority banned a Klarna Instagram influencer campaign, ruling that four posts had irresponsibly encouraged the use of deferred payment services to improve mood during the COVID-19 lockdown. In October 2020, Klarna mistakenly sent marketing emails to people who said they had not signed up for them, prompting the UK's Information Commissioner's Office to make enquiries.

=== Privacy, data and AML ===
In February 2020, German privacy specialists reported an autofill data issue at Klarna in which third parties could access address data, dates of birth and telephone numbers when they knew a customer's email address and postal code; the report said Klarna instructed merchants to turn off the autofill function temporarily. In May 2021, a technical incident in the Klarna app allowed some users to view data belonging to other customers for a short period. Klarna attributed the incident to human error, while Finansinspektionen later opened an investigation into a possible breach of bank secrecy rules.

In March 2022, the Swedish Authority for Privacy Protection imposed an administrative fine of SEK 7.5 million on Klarna Bank AB for shortcomings in its privacy information. In March 2024, a Swedish administrative court of appeal upheld the fine. In December 2024, Finansinspektionen issued Klarna Bank AB a formal remark and an administrative fine of SEK 500 million for violations of Swedish anti-money laundering regulations, citing deficiencies in general risk assessment and customer due diligence procedures.

=== Layoffs, AI and staffing ===
In May 2022, Klarna said it would lay off about 10% of its approximately 7,000 employees, citing deteriorating business sentiment linked to inflation and the war in Ukraine. The handling of the layoffs was criticised after Siemiatkowski published a list of affected employees on LinkedIn, which some observers described as insensitive.

In 2024, Klarna said an AI customer service assistant powered by OpenAI had handled about two-thirds of customer service chats in its first month and performed work equivalent to 700 full-time agents. Reuters later reported that Klarna expected further headcount reductions as it used AI to handle customer queries, while The Guardian reported in 2025 that the company's workforce had fallen from 5,527 in 2022 to 2,907, with Klarna attributing much of the reduction to natural attrition and replacement of some tasks by technology.

=== Fraud and scams ===
Media reports have described identity theft and fraud cases involving buy now, pay later services, including Klarna. The BBC reported in 2021 on a consumer who received a Klarna bill for a purchase she said she had not made, and CNBC reported that fraudsters had targeted BNPL providers including Klarna, Afterpay and Affirm. In 2019, Swedish media reported that Siemiatkowski had been called to a government meeting following criticism related to identity theft and consumer debt. Klarna says consumers who do not recognise a purchase and believe they may be victims of identity theft should report it to the company through its app or customer support.

== See also ==
- Buy now, pay later
- Digital banking
- Financial technology
- E-commerce
- N26
- Revolut
- Wise (company)
- List of banks in Sweden
