= Ovayok =

Ovayok may refer to:

- Mount Pelly, the Inuinnaqtun name for the mountain
- Ovayok Territorial Park, of which the mountain forms part
