= Uppsalaåsen =

Esker in Sweden

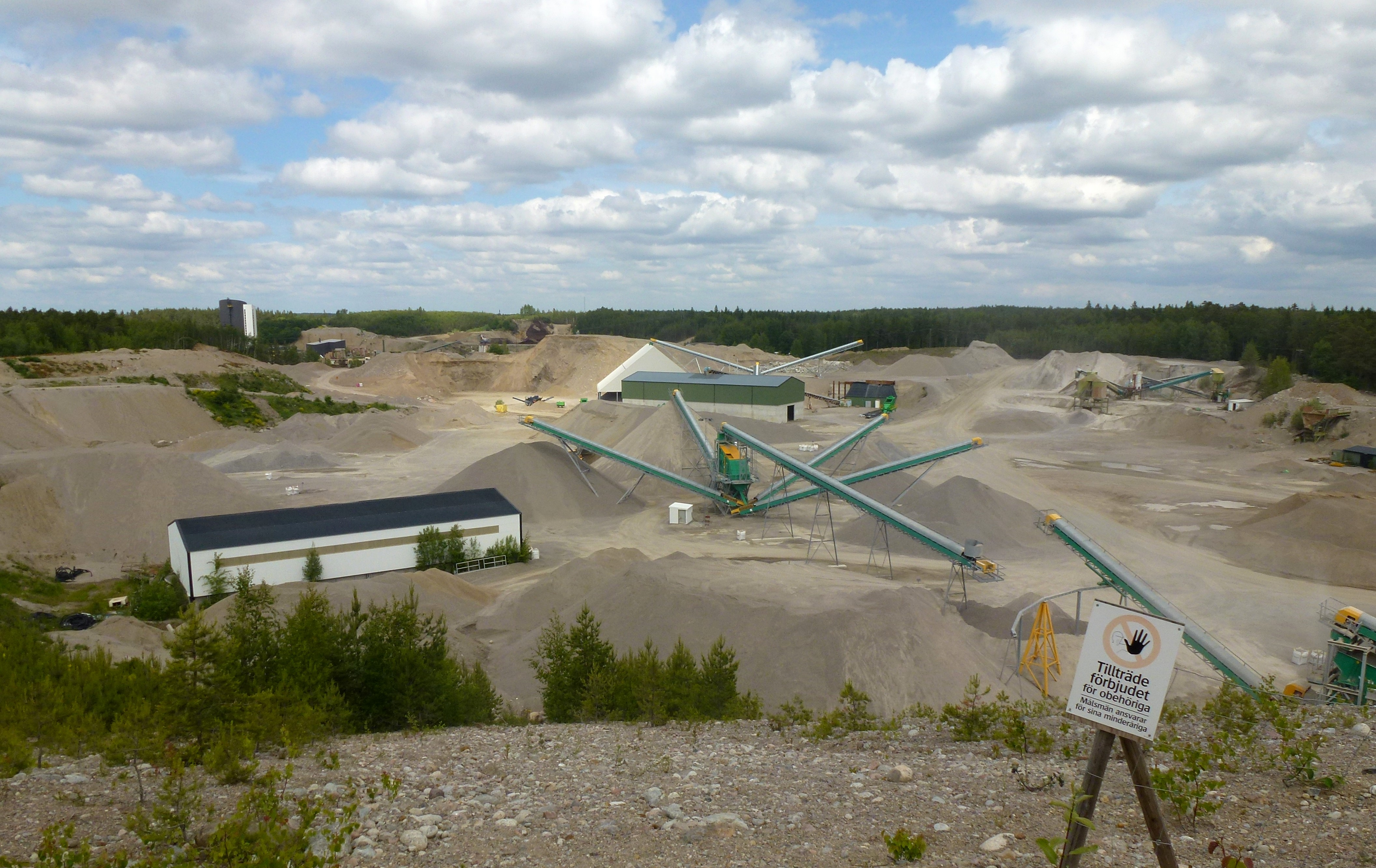
Gravel pit in Tullingeåsen, which forms part of Uppsalaåsen.

Uppsalaåsen is an esker ridge that winds its way across Uppland in Sweden. The ridge disappears and reappears, typically locally named.

In the south it begins on southernmost Södertörn and runs north-east, crossing Mälaren via Ekerö and Munsö and reaches the mainland at Bålsta. It then continues across the Uppland landscape and past Uppsala, eventually in the form of Billudden disappearing into the Gävle Bay. The ridge continues on the seafloor and curves northwest, appearing at Sandarna on the Hälsinge coast. The ridge is estimated to be 250 kilometers long, with maximum width about 1 km, and height about 75 m.

== Names ==
Within Uppsala County the ridge has several names. At its southern extremity at Sunnersta it is called Sunnerstaåsen and is used among other things as a ski slope. Between Ultuna and Ulleråker lies Ultunaåsen. North of Polacksbacken in Uppsala follows Kronåsen, with a monument to Sten Sture the Elder at its summit. Centrally in Uppsala lies Kasåsen, on which Uppsala Castle is built. The ridge then crosses Fyrisån and reappears again in northern Svartbäcken, now called Röboåsen. It then becomes Tunåsen and Högåsen at Gamla Uppsala.

== Nature preserves ==
The ridge is a nature preserve at Arnöhuvud and Kungshamn-Morga, on each side of Ekoln. It is also a preserve at Högsta outside Lövstalöt, as well at the shingle beach Viksta stentorg (due to post-glacial rebound it is now found 70 meters above the sea level and far inland). Billudden, where it descends into the Gävle Bay, is protected.

== See also ==
- Stockholmsåsen
- Brunkebergsåsen
