= Varesemäed Landscape Conservation Area =

Protected area in Estonia

- Location within Estonia
- Location: Estonia
- Coordinates: 58°24′30″N 25°41′00″E
- Area: 24 ha (59 acres)
- Established: 1964 (2009)

Varesemäed Landscape Conservation Area (Estonian: Varesemägede maastikukaitseala) is a nature park in Viljandi County, Estonia.

Its area is 24 ha.

The protected area was designated in 1964 to protect Varesemäed eskers and its surrounding areas. In 2009, the protected area was redesigned to the landscape conservation area.
