= Eskers Provincial Park =

Provincial park in British Columbia

- IUCN category III (natural monument or feature)
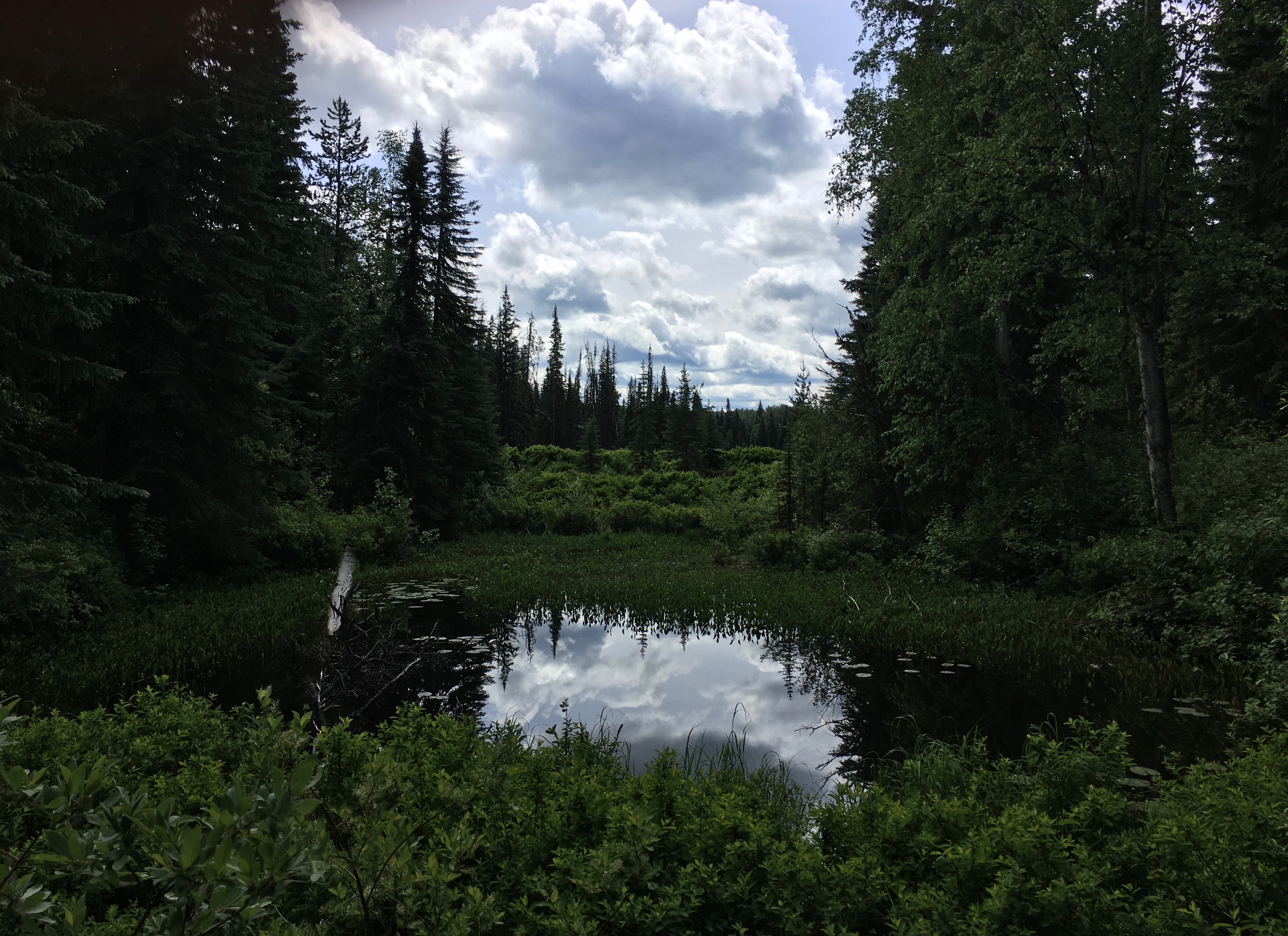
- Pine Marsh in Eskers Provincial Park

- Location within British Columbia
- Interactive map of Eskers Provincial Park
- Location: Cassiar Land District, British Columbia, Canada
- Nearest city: Prince George, BC
- Coordinates: 54°05′04″N 123°12′50″W
- Area: 4,044 ha (9,990 acres)
- Established: December 3, 1987
- Governing body: BC Parks

Eskers Provincial Park is a provincial park in British Columbia, Canada. The park covers approximately 4,044 hectares (40.44 km^{2}; 15.61 sq mi) and was created in 1987 and is located west of Nukko Lake, which lies northwest of the city of Prince George. The park protects an area of the 40-kilometre (25 mi) Stuart River Eskers Complex. Eskers are winding ridges of gravel formed by glaciers which once covered the British Columbia Interior.
