= Rainbow Lake (New York) =

Lake in the northern Adirondacks, New York, United States

- Coordinates: 44°28′50″N 74°10′01″W

Location
- Interactive map of Rainbow Lake

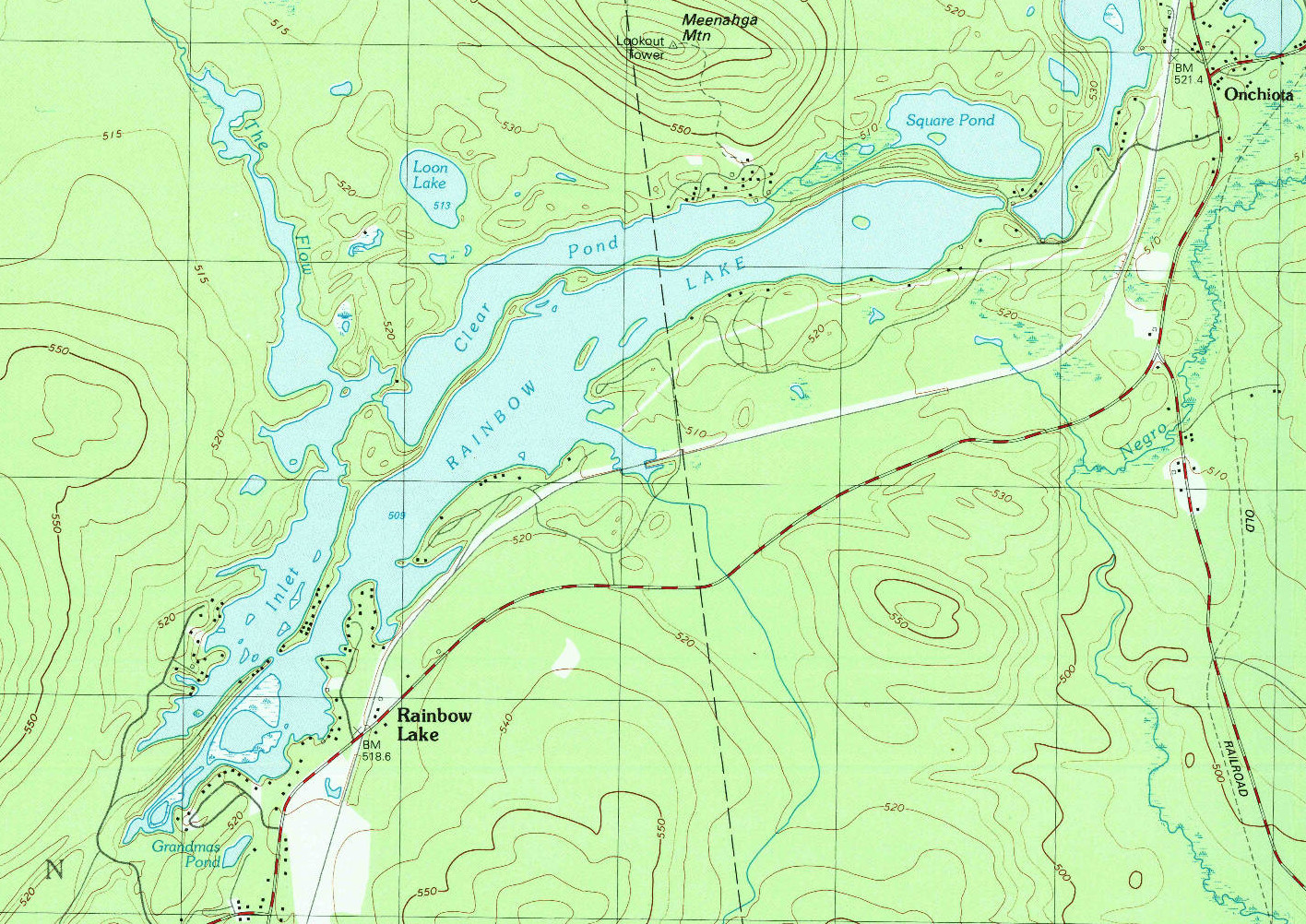
Topographic map of Rainbow Lake and surroundings. Grid squares are 1 km × 1 km. Contour interval 10 m.

Rainbow Lake is a small lake in the northern Adirondacks of New York, United States. The esker that bisects the eponymous lake extends discontinuously for 85 miles (137 km). Its area is 588.4 acres (238.1 ha) with a depth of over 50 feet (15 m); the adjacent Clear Pond on the north side of the esker has an area of 96.8 acres (39.2 ha) and a similar depth. The lake was certified as loon-friendly in 2002 by the Adirondack Center for Loon Conservation.
