= Billudden =

Billudden Nature Reserve
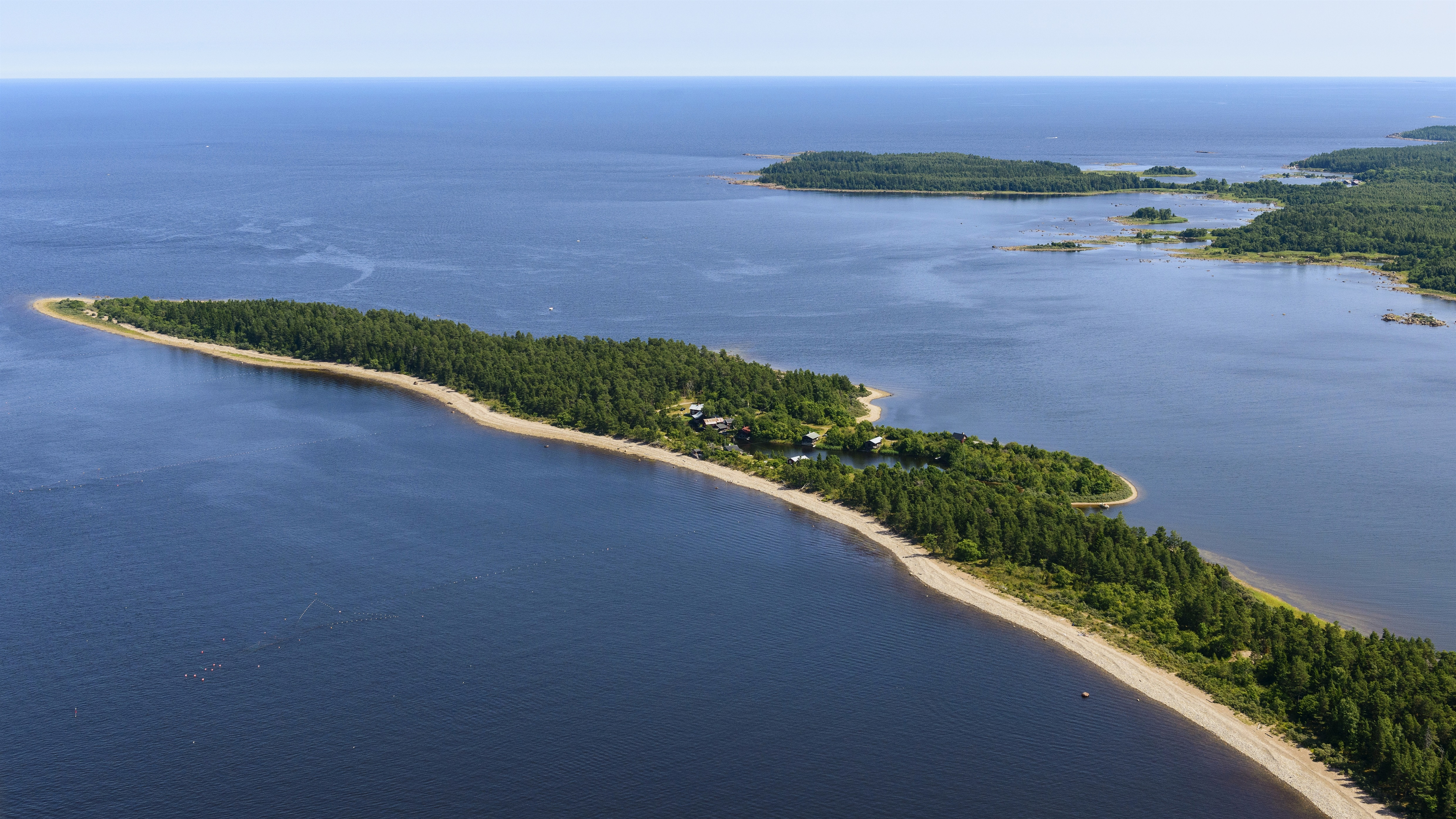

- Location within Uppsala Location within Sweden
- Location: Sweden
- Nearest city: Skutskär, Uppsala County
- Coordinates: 60°40′08.04″N 17°31′54.84″E
- Area: 1,930 ha (4,800 acres; 19.3 km^{2})
- Established: 1979

Billudden is a nature reserve in Uppsala County, Sweden.

Billudden is the outermost part of Uppsalaåsen; here the esker forms a promontory into the sea before disappearing from sight underwater. The nature reserve is characterised by the hilly form of the esker, which is still rising with as much as 70 centimetres (28 in) per century due to post-glacial rebound. Areas of windblown sand and sparse Scots pine (Pinus sylvestris) woods can also be found in the nature reserve. The nature reserve furthermore contains the largest concentration of sea-buckthorn (Hippophae rhamnoides) in Europe and several unusual fungi. There are two nature trails with information about the nature of the reserve intended for the educational use of both grown ups and children in the reserve.

There is a former fishing hamlet called Billhamn on the promontory. It lies next to a natural harbour which formed during the last ice age when an ice block of unusually large proportions melted here, creating a circular indent in the shoreline. Today there are no permanent residents and the houses are used as holiday homes.
