= Nukko Lake =

Nukko Lake is a lake in British Columbia, Canada. It is surrounded by the broader Nukko Lake community.

== Description ==
Nukko Lake is located near Swamp Lake and Chief Lake. The Nukko Lake Elementary School is part of the Prince George School District 57. The surrounding community was served by a single general store since at least the 1950s until 2015.
