= Arnöhuvud Nature Reserve =

Nature reserve in Uppsala, Sweden

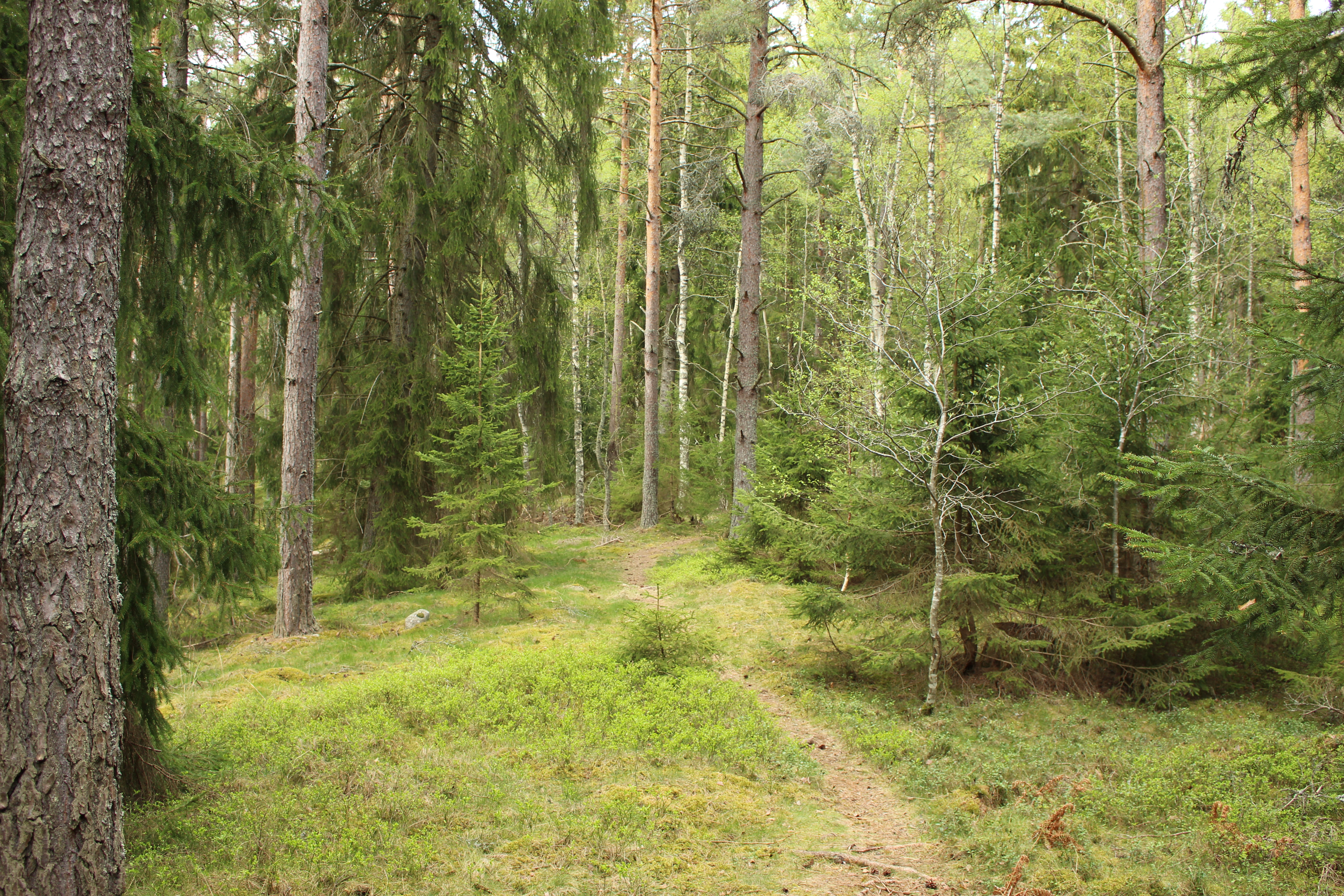

- Location within Uppsala
- Location: Sweden
- Nearest city: Sigtuna
- Coordinates: 59°43′40″N 17°33′10″E
- Area: 82.3 ha (203 acres)

Arnöhuvud Nature Reserve is a nature reserve in Uppsala County, Sweden.

The nature reserve protects a forested and relatively high peninsula in Lake Mälaren, part of a much longer ridge. It rises to approximately 45 m (148 ft) in the nature reserve. It is covered with old-growth forest consisting mainly of Norway spruce and Scots pine. The rich fauna includes hare, roe deer, pheasants and several types of marine birds. The nature reserve furthermore contains several cairns dating from the Bronze Age. The nature reserve is part of the EU-wide Natura 2000 network.
