= Uvayuq =

Mountain in Nunavut, Canada

- Ovayok; Mount Pelly
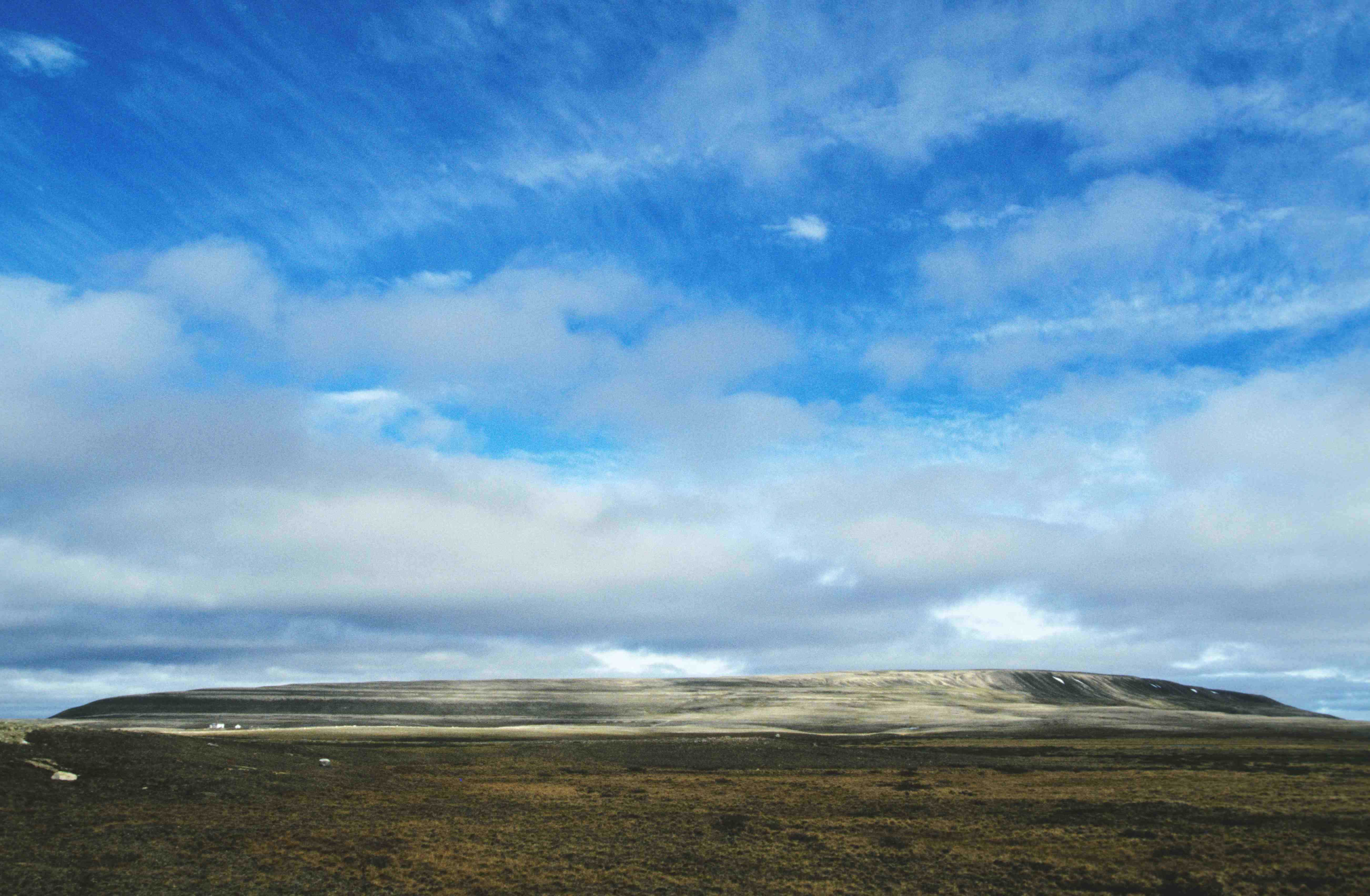
- Uvayuq, north of Cambridge Bay (Victoria Island)

Highest point
- Elevation: More than 200 m (660 ft)
- Coordinates: 69°10′27″N 104°42′43″W

Geography
- Location within Nunavut
- Location: Nunavut, Canada

Geology
- Mountain type: Esker

Uvayuq, formerly Ovayok or Mount Pelly, is an esker in the Kitikmeot Region, Nunavut. It is located in northern Canada on Victoria Island within the Ovayok Territorial Park. The hill, which is more than 200 m (660 ft) high, is located 15 km (9.3 mi) north east of the hamlet of Cambridge Bay, Nunavut.

== History ==
The area around Uvayuq has long been used by Inuit for hunting and there are over 120 archaeological sites on the esker. These include pirujaq (storage cache), campsites and a grave. The oddest find was a stack of loon bones that had been "cut at every joint". This find, which the local elders indicated was something they had never seen and must have happened before their grandparents were alive, fitted in with an Inuit legend. The legend indicated that people in the area were starving and they were saved only when a skilled hunter killed a loon. To feed all the people the bones had to be broken at the joints so all could be fed.

== Modern history ==
The esker was given its English name by Thomas Simpson and Peter Warren Dease in 1839 to honour Sir John Henry Pelly, governor of the Hudson's Bay Company. Simpson and Dease had travelled from Great Bear Lake, down the Coppermine River, to Back River. In 1850-51 John Rae, while searching the south coast of Victoria Island for clues to the lost expedition of John Franklin, climbed to the top of Mount Pelly.

== Traditional belief ==
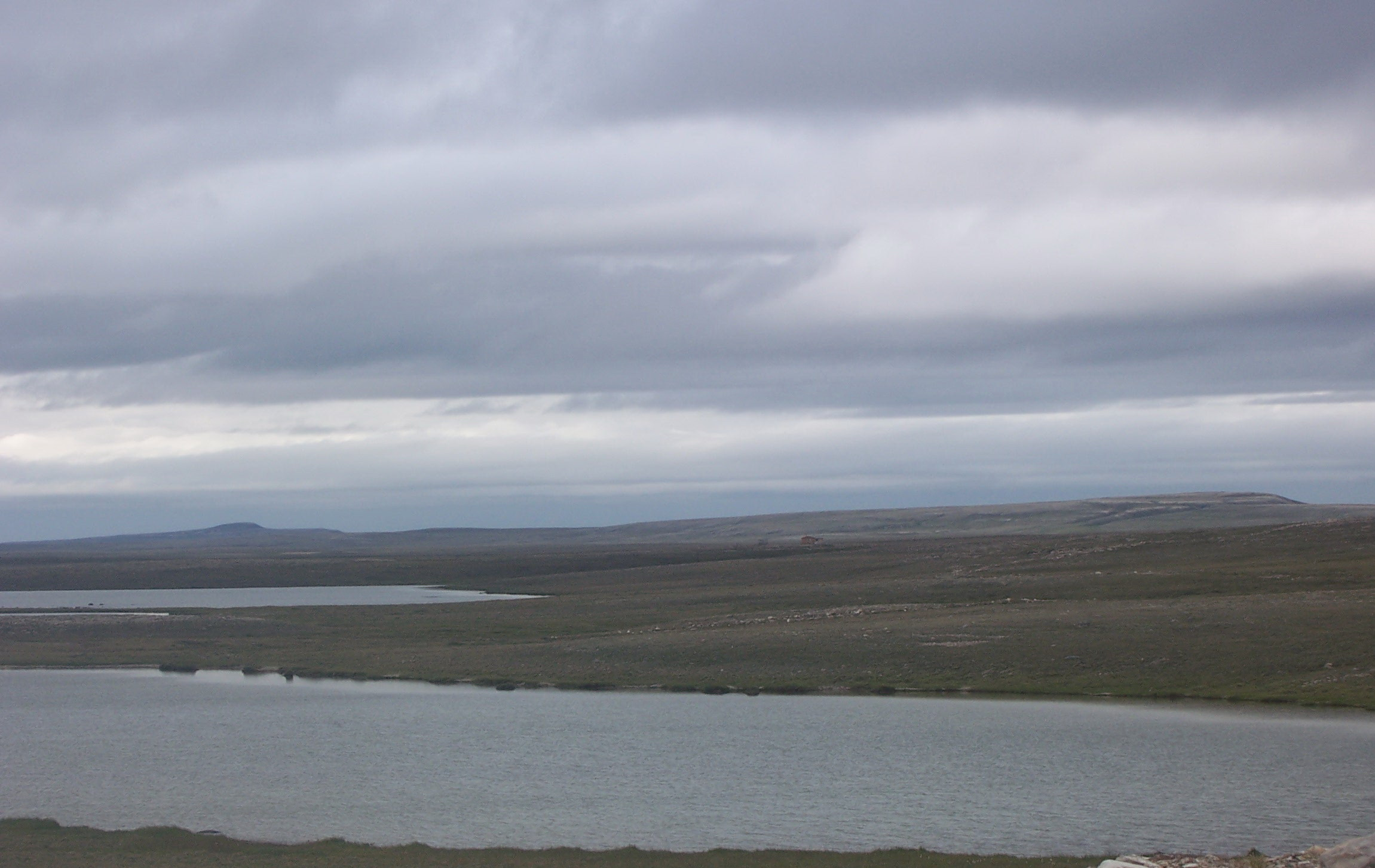
Inuuhuktu (Baby Pelly) and Amaaqtuq (Lady Pelly)

Northwest of Uvayuq are two more eskers called Inuuhuktu (Baby Pelly) and Amaaqtuq (Lady Pelly). Inuit legend says that the three hills are a family of starving giants. They were crossing Victoria Island looking for food and the father, Uvayuq, died first. Next the son, Inuuhuktu (English; "teenaged boy"), died and was followed by the mother, Amaaqtuq (English; "packing baby", see amauti), who was carrying her baby.
