= Ovayok Territorial Park =

Territorial park in Nunavut

Coordinates: 69°10′27″N 104°42′43″W

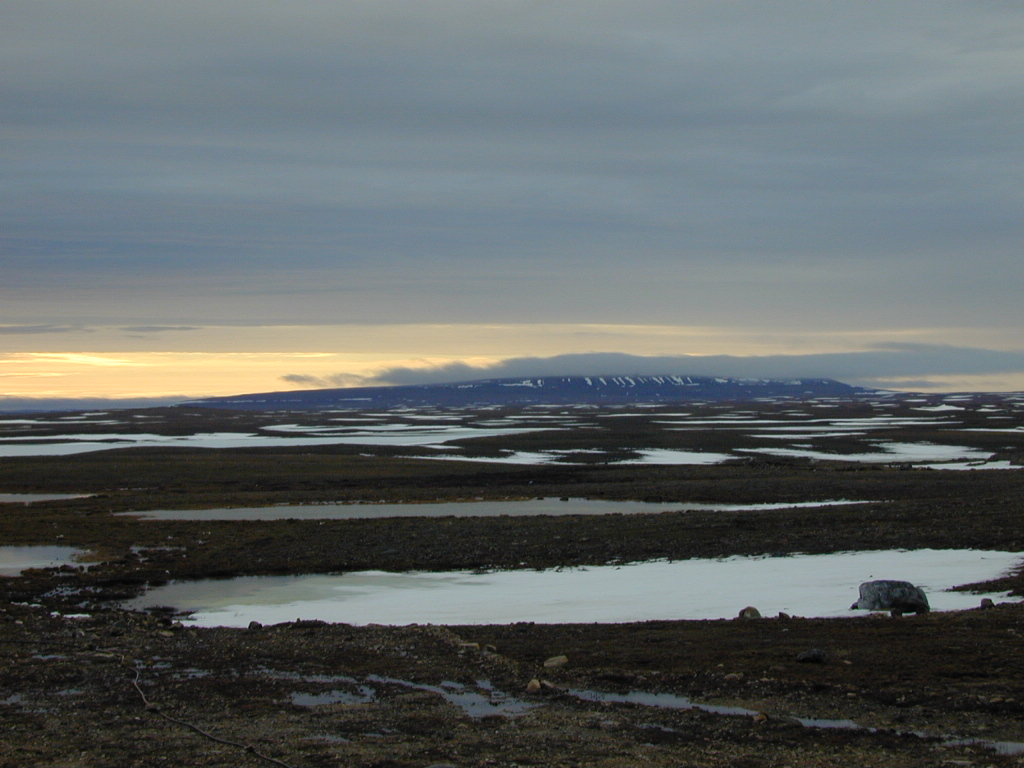
Looking north towards Ovayok

Ovayok Territorial Park (sometimes Uvajuq, formerly Mount Pelly) is a park situated 15 km (9.3 mi) east of Cambridge Bay, in the Kitikmeot Region, Nunavut, Canada. The park is relatively small and covers an area of approximately 16 km^{2} (6.2 sq mi). The park can be accessed by vehicle from the community as a gravel road runs directly to it.

The park has a wide variety of wildlife with muskox being predominant; there are also barren-ground caribou, Arctic hare, Arctic fox, and North American brown lemmings. There are several lakes within the park and most contain Arctic char and lake trout. Birds include Arctic terns, ptarmigan, Canada geese, snowy owls and the common raven.

There are several archaeological sites within the park and these include tent rings and food caches. Thule and Paleo-Eskimo camp sites and artifacts has also been found nearby, suggesting that the area has been in use for at least a 1,000 years.

The predominant feature of the park is the large esker known as Uvayuq (formerly Mount Pelly) that rises to approximately 183 m (600 ft). Behind this are two more eskers called Inuuhuktu (Baby Pelly) and Amaaqtuq (Lady Pelly).

Inuit legend says that the three hills are a family of starving giants. They were crossing Victoria Island looking for food and the father, Uvayuq, died first. Next the son, Inuuhuktu (English; "teenaged boy"), died and was followed by the mother, Amaaqtuq (English; "packing baby", see amauti), who was carrying her baby.

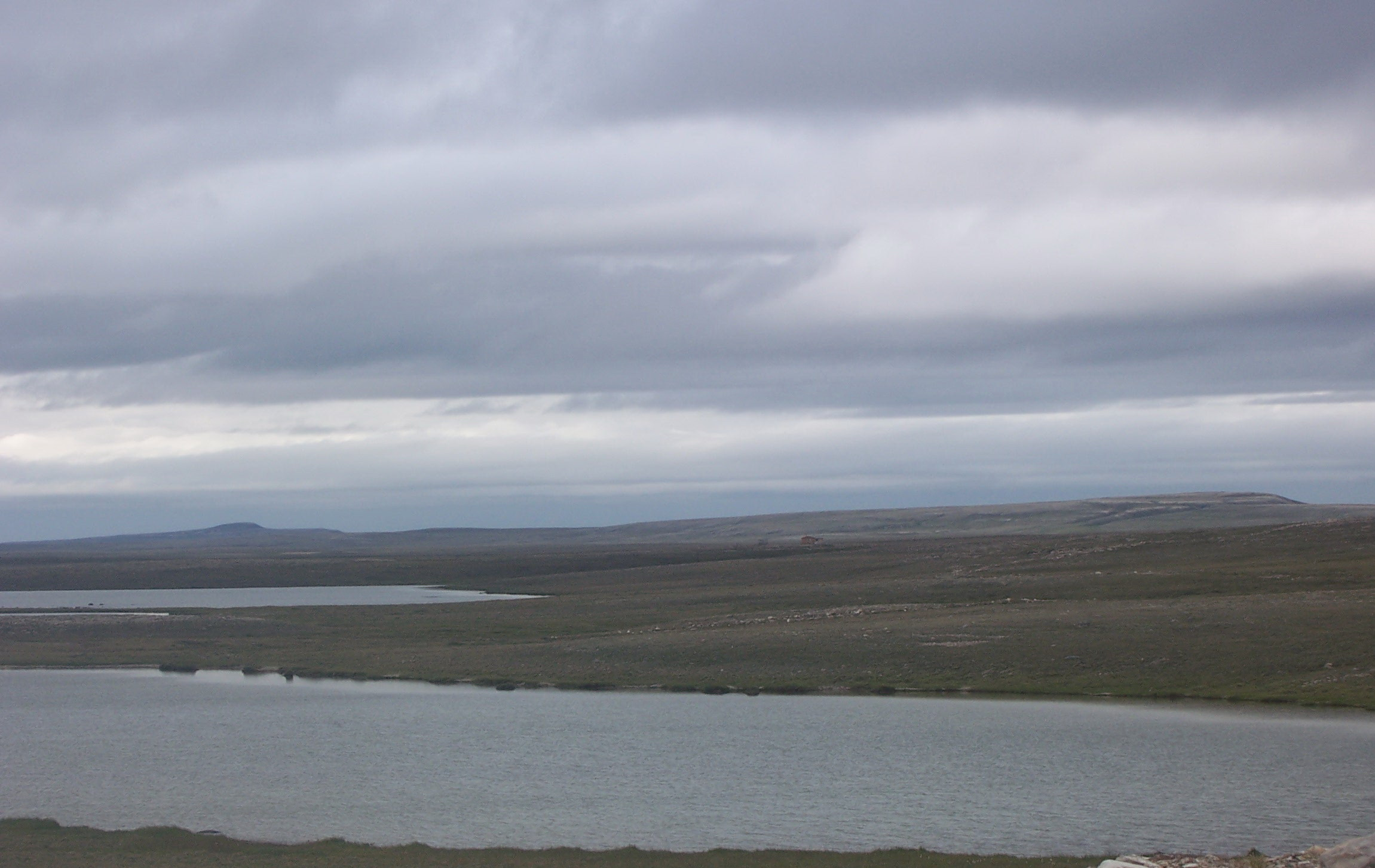
Inuuhuktu (Baby Pelly) and Amaaqtuq (Lady Pelly)

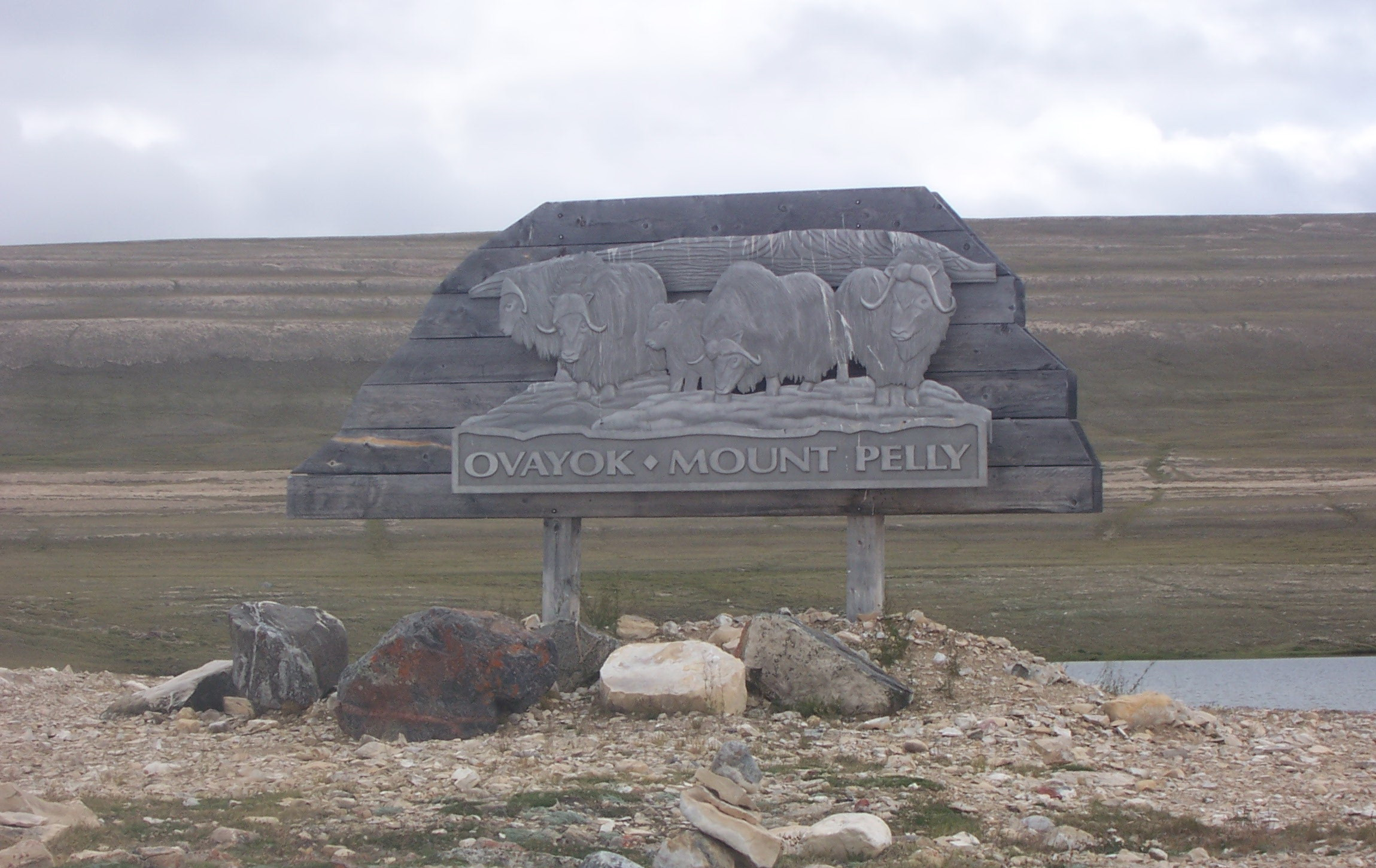
Sign at the park

== See also ==
- List of Nunavut parks
