= Esker =

Long, winding ridge of stratified sand and gravel associated with former glaciers

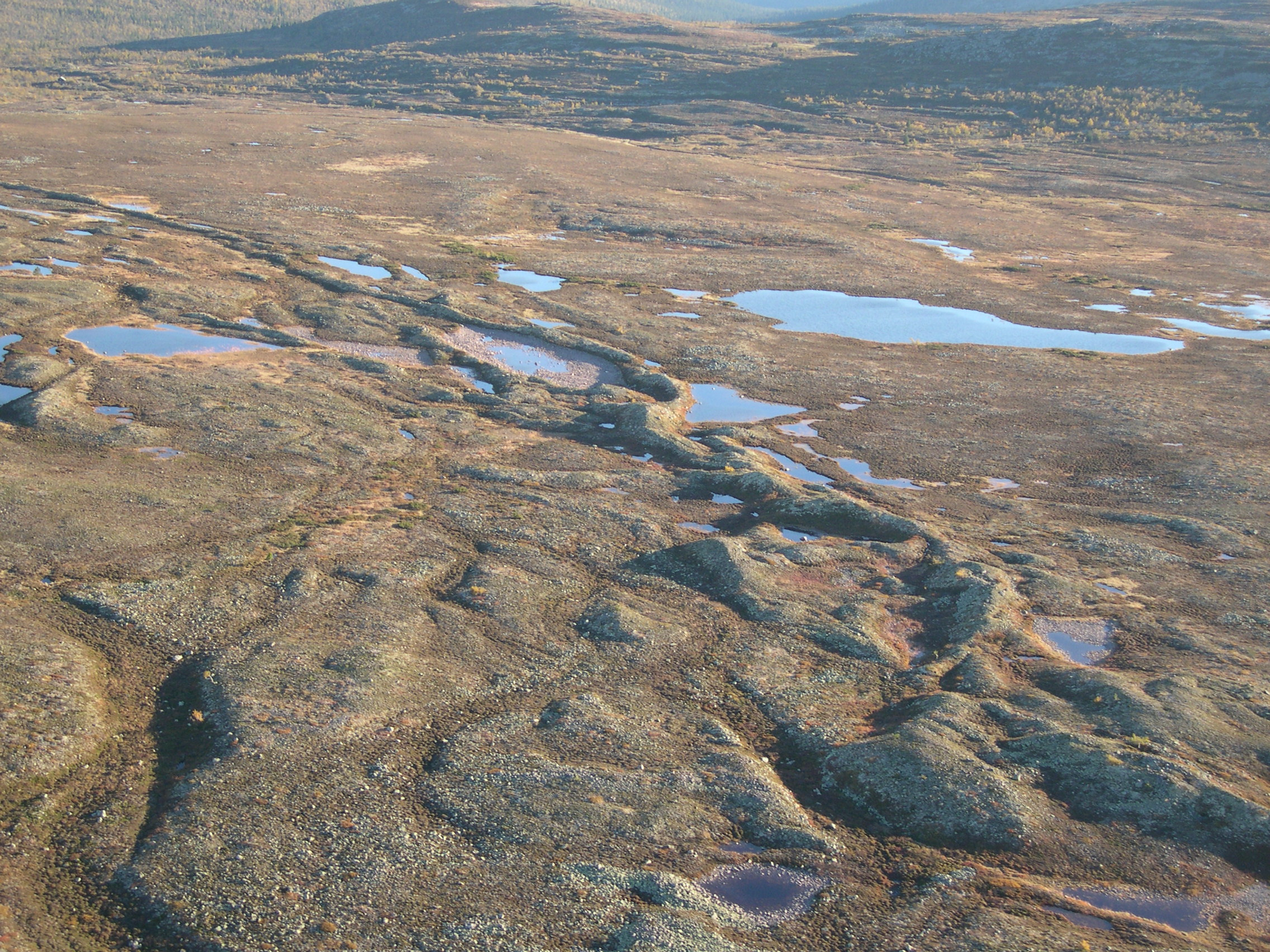
Esker at Fulufjället, western Sweden

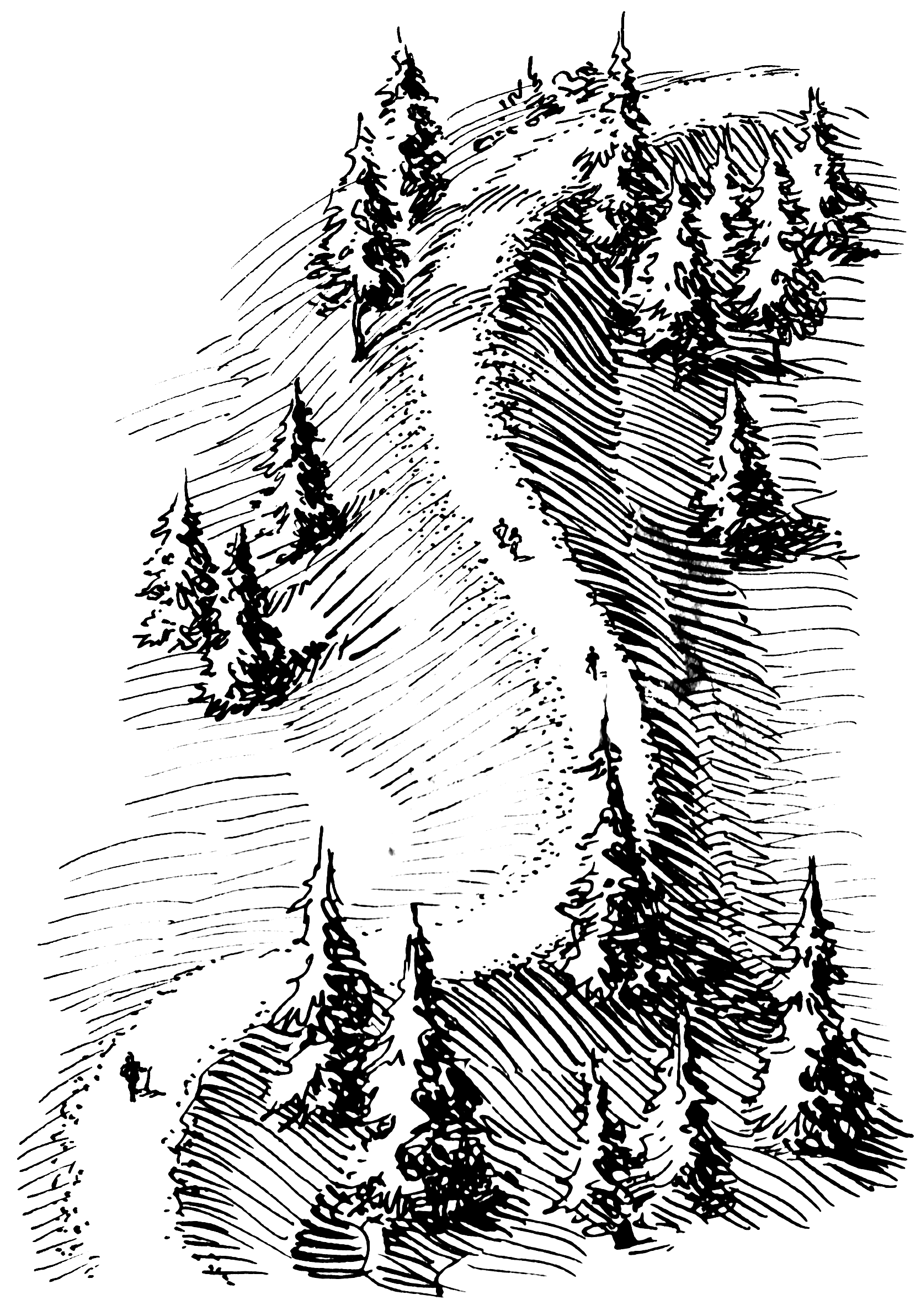
Esker used as a hiking path

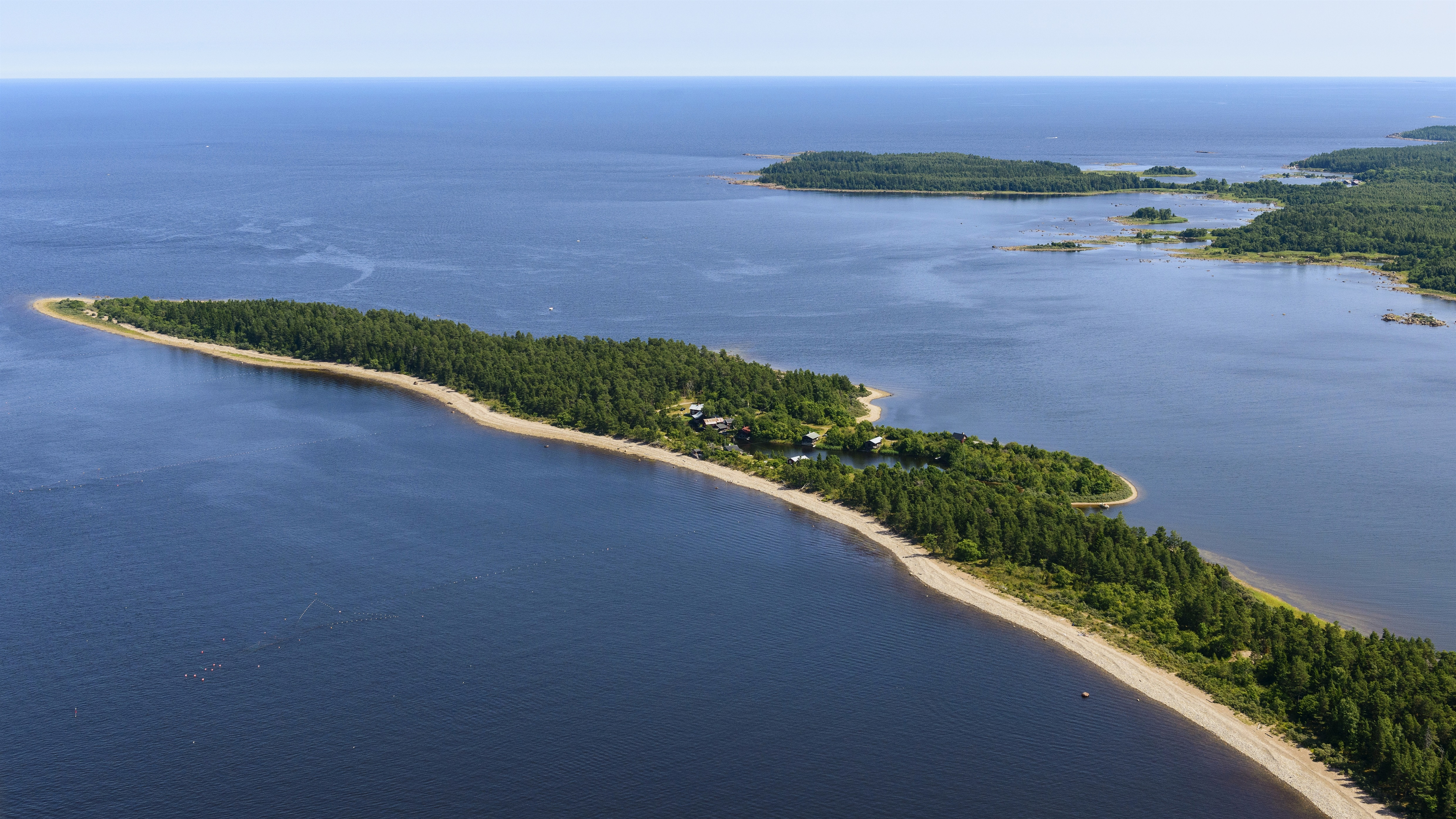
Aerial view of a partially drowned esker at Billudden in northern Uppland, Sweden. The shape is modified by coastal processes.

An esker, eskar, eschar, or os (sometimes called an asar, osar, or serpent kame) is a long, winding ridge of stratified sand and gravel, examples of which occur in glaciated and formerly glaciated regions of Europe and North America. They are most often formed by the deposition of sediment at the bottom of ice-walled channels within or beneath a former glacier. As a glacier retreats, the channel walls melt while the accumulated sediment remains, slumping into ridges as the only remaining evidence of the former channel path. They represent an unusual form of sedimentation where the location of the former channel is higher than the surrounding landform. Eskers are frequently several kilometres long and, because of their uniform shape, look like railway embankments.

== Etymology ==
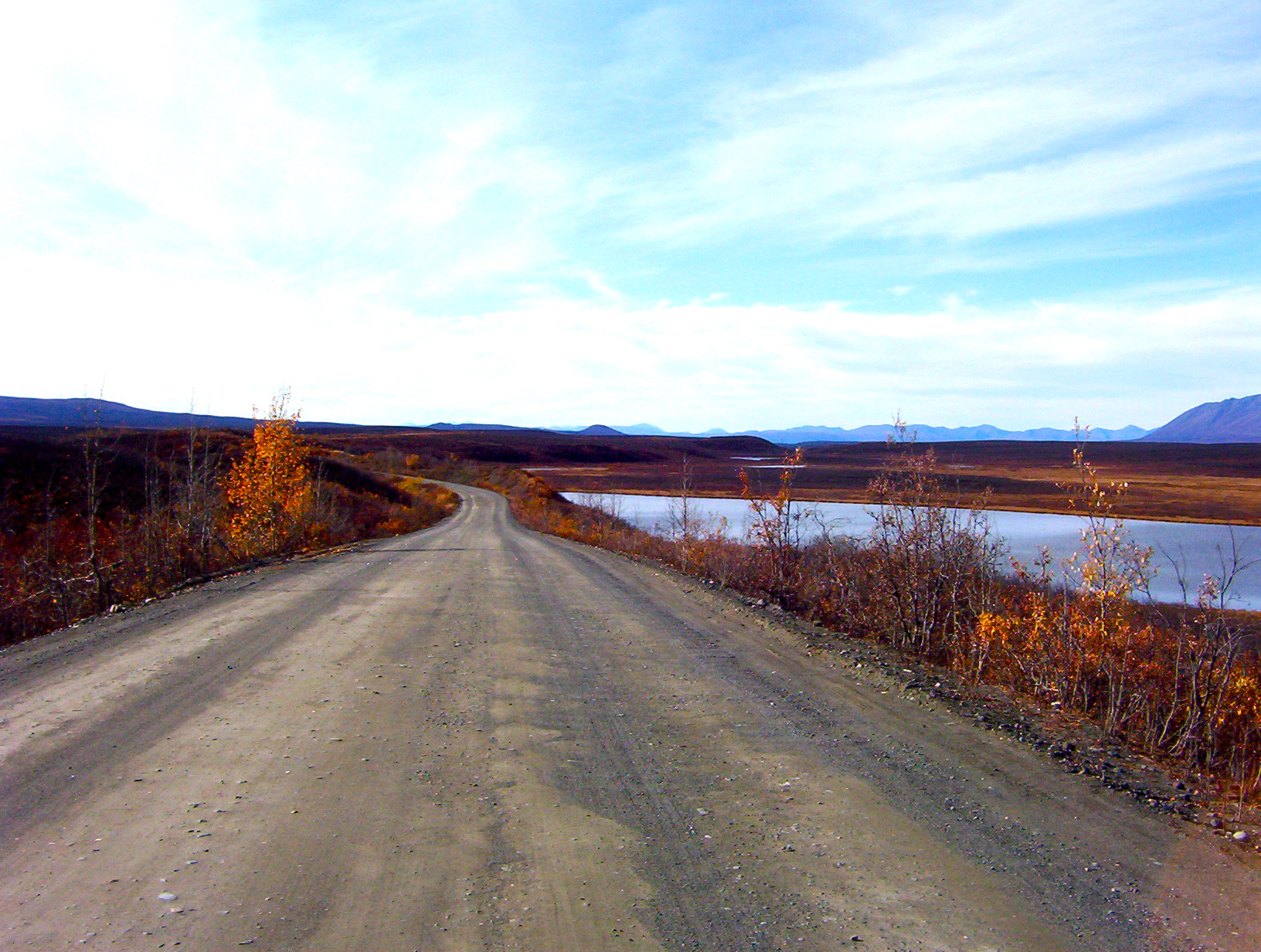
Portions of the Denali Highway in Alaska are built on eskers.

The term esker is derived from the Irish word eiscir (Old Irish: escir), which means "ridge or elevation, especially one separating two plains or depressed surfaces". The Irish word was and is used particularly to describe long sinuous ridges, which are now known to be deposits of fluvioglacial material. The best-known example of such an eiscir is the Eiscir Riada, which runs nearly the whole width of Ireland from Dublin to Galway, a distance of 200 km (120 mi).

The synonym os comes from the Swedish word ås, "ridge".

== Geology ==
Most eskers are argued to have formed within ice-walled tunnels by streams that flowed within and under glaciers. They tend to form around the time of the glacial maximum, when a glacier is slow and sluggish. After the retaining ice walls melt away, stream deposits remain as long winding ridges.

Eskers may also form above glaciers by accumulation of sediment in supraglacial channels, in crevasses, in linear zones between stagnant blocks, or in narrow embayments at glacier margins. Eskers form near the terminal zone of glaciers, where the ice is not moving as fast and is relatively thin.

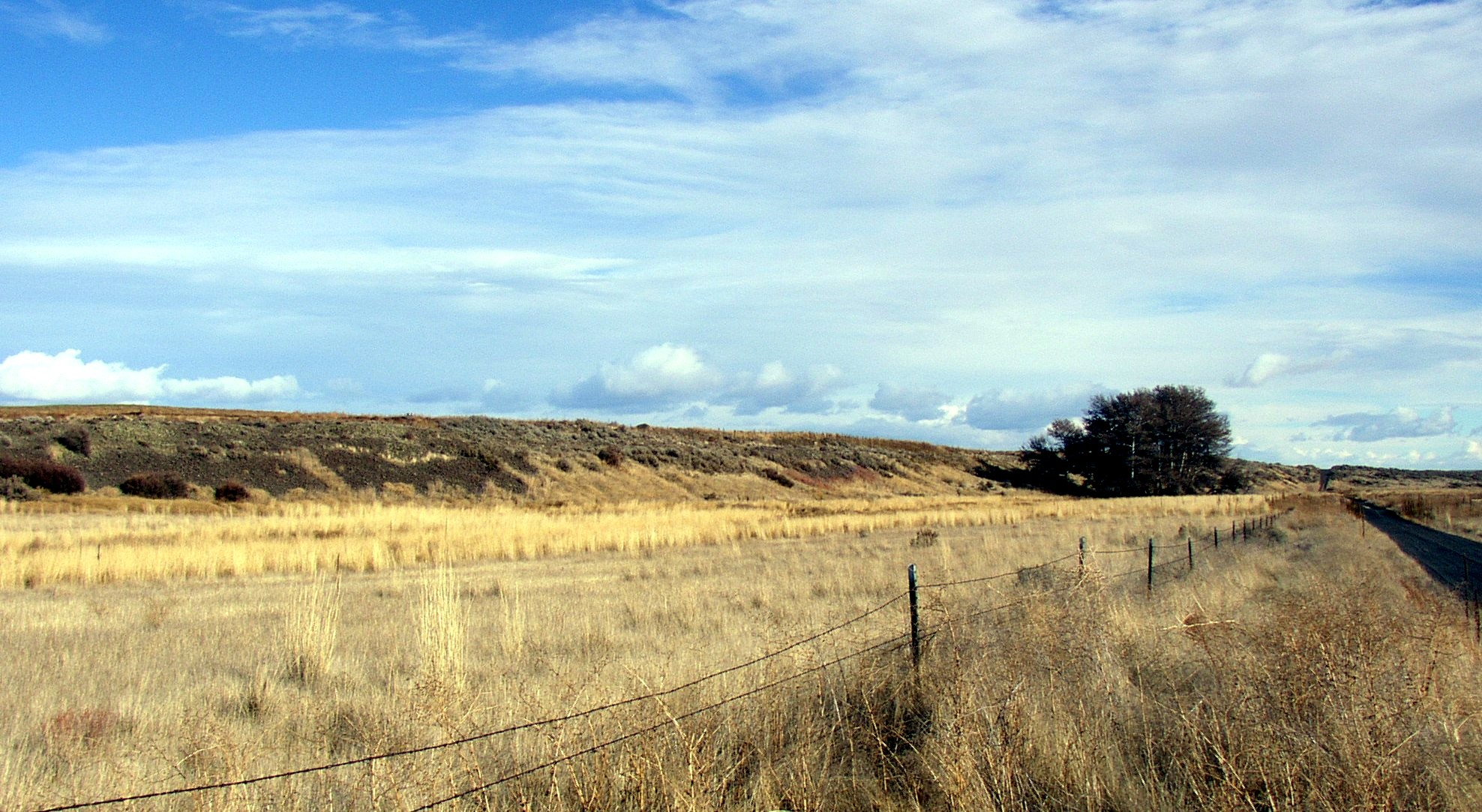
Esker in Sims Corner Eskers and Kames National Natural Landmark, Washington, US. (Trees at the edge of the esker and the single lane road crossing the esker to the right of the photo provide scale.)

Plastic flow and melting of the basal ice determines the size and shape of the subglacial tunnel. This in turn determines the shape, composition and structure of an esker. Eskers may exist as a single channel or may be part of a branching system with tributary eskers. They are not often found as continuous ridges but have gaps that separate the winding segments. The ridge crests of eskers are not usually level for very long and are generally knobby. Eskers may be broad-crested or sharp-crested with steep sides. They can reach hundreds of kilometers in length and are generally 20–30 m (66–98 ft) in height.

The path of an esker is governed by its water pressure in relation to the overlying ice. Generally, the pressure of the ice is at such a point that it allows eskers to run in the direction of glacial flow but forces them into the lowest points such as valleys or river beds, which may deviate from the direct path of the glacier. This process is what produces the wide eskers upon which roads and highways can be built. Less pressure, occurring in areas closer to the glacial maximum, can cause ice to melt over the stream flow and create steep-walled, sharply-arched tunnels.

The amount of sediment in an esker is governed by the concentration of rock debris in the ice and the rate at which sediment is delivered to the tunnel by melting and from upstream transport. The sediment generally consists of coarse-grained, water-laid sand and gravel, although gravelly loam may be found where the rock debris is rich in clay. This sediment is stratified and sorted, and usually consists of pebble/cobble-sized material with occasional boulders. Bedding may be irregular but is almost always present, and cross-bedding is common.

There are various cases where inland dunes have developed next to eskers after deglaciation. These dunes are often found in the leeward side of eskers, if the esker is not oriented parallel to prevailing winds. Examples of dunes developed on eskers can be found in both Swedish and Finnish Lapland. Lakes may form within depressions in eskers. These lakes can lack surface outflows and inflows and have drastic fluctuations over time.

== Ecology ==
Eskers are critical to the ecology of northern Canada. Several plants that grow on eskers, including bear root and cranberries, are important food for bears and migrating waterfowl; animals from grizzly bears to tundra wolves to ground squirrels can burrow into the eskers to survive the long winters.

== Examples ==
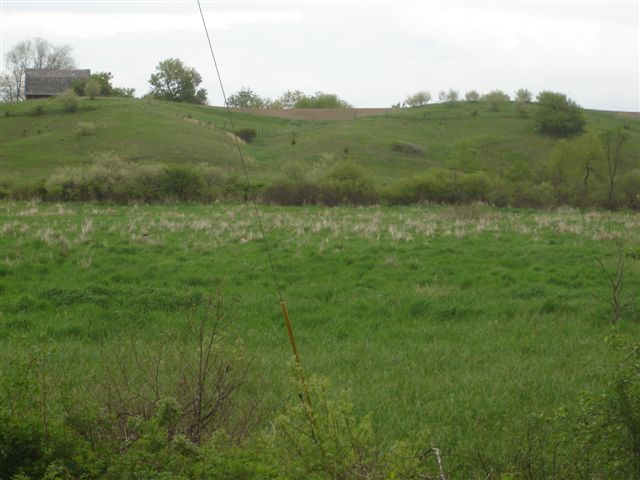
A part of the Mason Esker

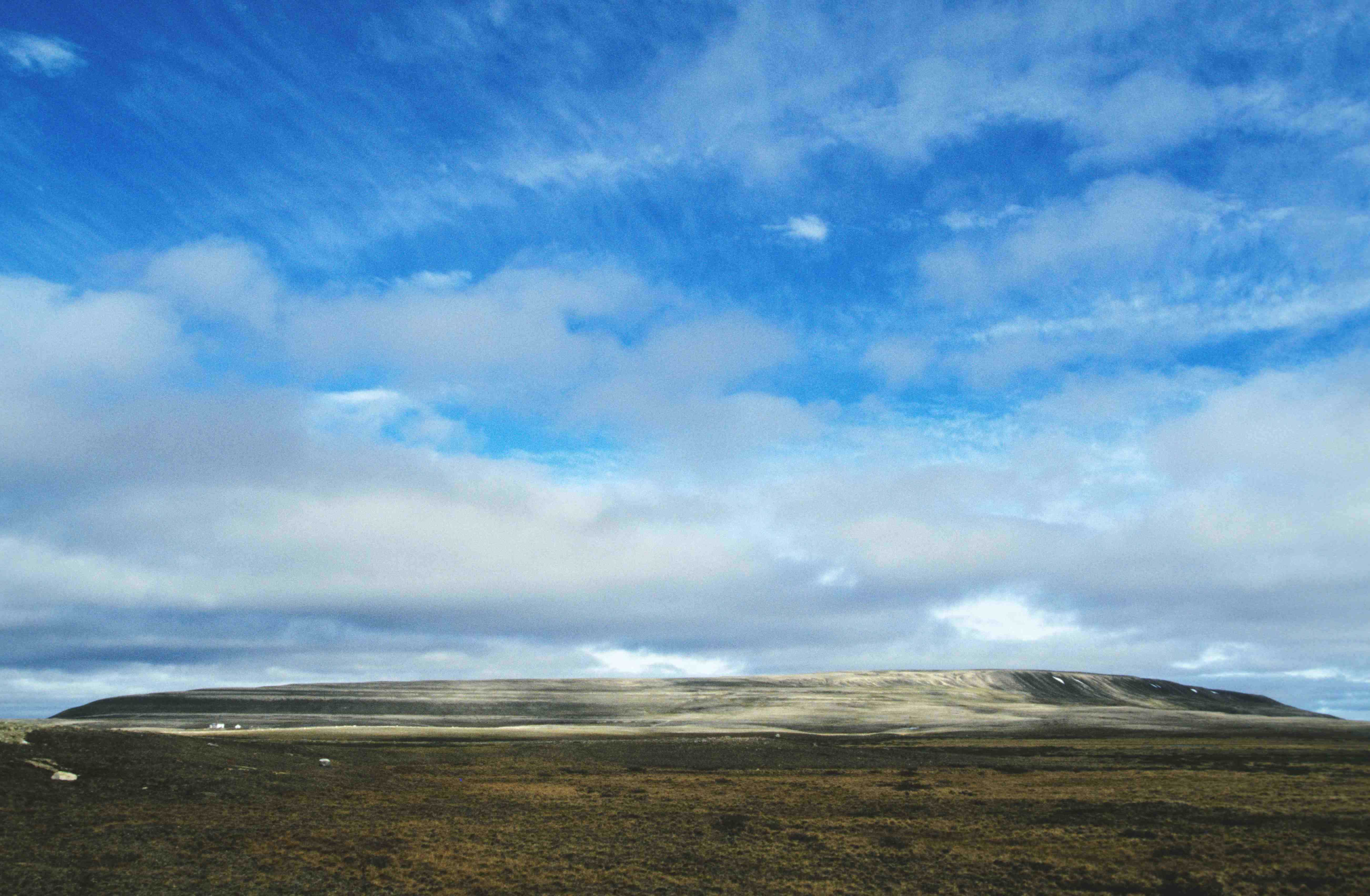
Mount Pelly or Ovayok

=== Europe ===
In Sweden, Uppsalaåsen stretches for 250 km (160 mi) and passes through Uppsala. The Badelundaåsen esker runs for over 300 km (190 mi) from Nyköping to lake Siljan. Pispala's Pyynikki Esker in Tampere, Finland, is on an esker between two lakes carved by glaciers. A similar site is Punkaharju in Finnish Lakeland.

Kemnay, Aberdeenshire, Scotland has a 5 km (3.1 mi) esker called the Kemb Hills. In Berwickshire in southeast Scotland is Bedshiel Kaims, a 3 km-long (1.9 mi) example which is up to 15 m (49 ft) high and is a legacy of an ice-stream within the River Tweed valley.

=== North America ===
Great Esker Park, containing one of the highest eskers in North America at 27 m (90 ft), runs along the Weymouth Back River in Weymouth, Massachusetts.

There are over 1,000 eskers in Michigan, primarily in the south-central Lower Peninsula. The longest esker in Michigan is the 35 km-long (22 mi) Mason Esker, which stretches south-southeast from DeWitt through Lansing and Holt, before ending near Mason.

Esker systems in Maine can be traced for up to 160 km (100 mi).

Thelon Esker is almost 800 km (500 mi) long, straddling the boundary between Nunavut and Northwest Territories. Uvayuq or Mount Pelly, in Ovayok Territorial Park, the Kitikmeot Region, Nunavut is an esker.

Roads are sometimes built along eskers to save expense. Examples include the Denali Highway in Alaska, the Trans-Taiga Road in Quebec, and the "Airline" segment of Maine State Route 9 between Bangor and Calais.

There are numerous long eskers in Adirondack Park, New York. The Rainbow Lake esker bisects the eponymous lake and extends discontinuously for 85 miles (c. 137 km). A long discontinuous esker extends from Mountain Pond through Keese Mill, passing between Upper St. Regis Lake and the Spectacle Ponds, and continuing to Ochre, Fish, and Lydia Ponds in the St. Regis Canoe Area. A 150-foot-high esker bisects the Five Ponds Wilderness Area.

== See also ==
- Eskers Provincial Park – Provincial park in British Columbia
- Glacial landform – Landform created by the action of glaciers
- Glacier morphology – Geomorphology of glaciers
- Kame – Mound formed on a retreating glacier and deposited on land
- Tunnel valley – Glacial-formed geographic feature
