= Kiaby Church =

- Kiaby kyrka
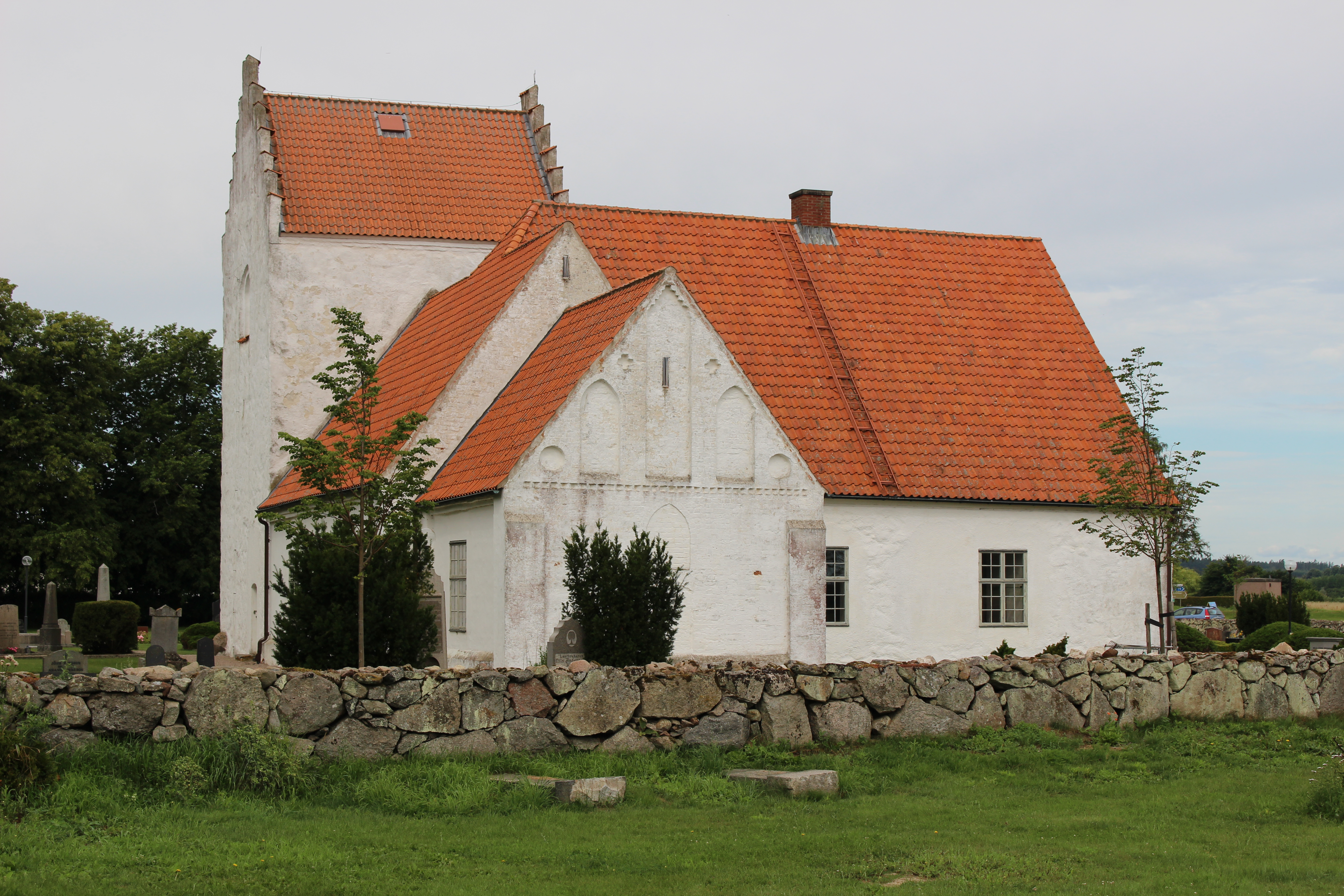
- Kiaby Church

- 56°03′57″N 14°20′00″E
- Country: Sweden
- Denomination: Church of Sweden

Kiaby Church (Swedish: Kiaby kyrka) is a medieval church in the province of Skåne, Sweden. It belongs to the Diocese of Lund.

== History and architecture ==
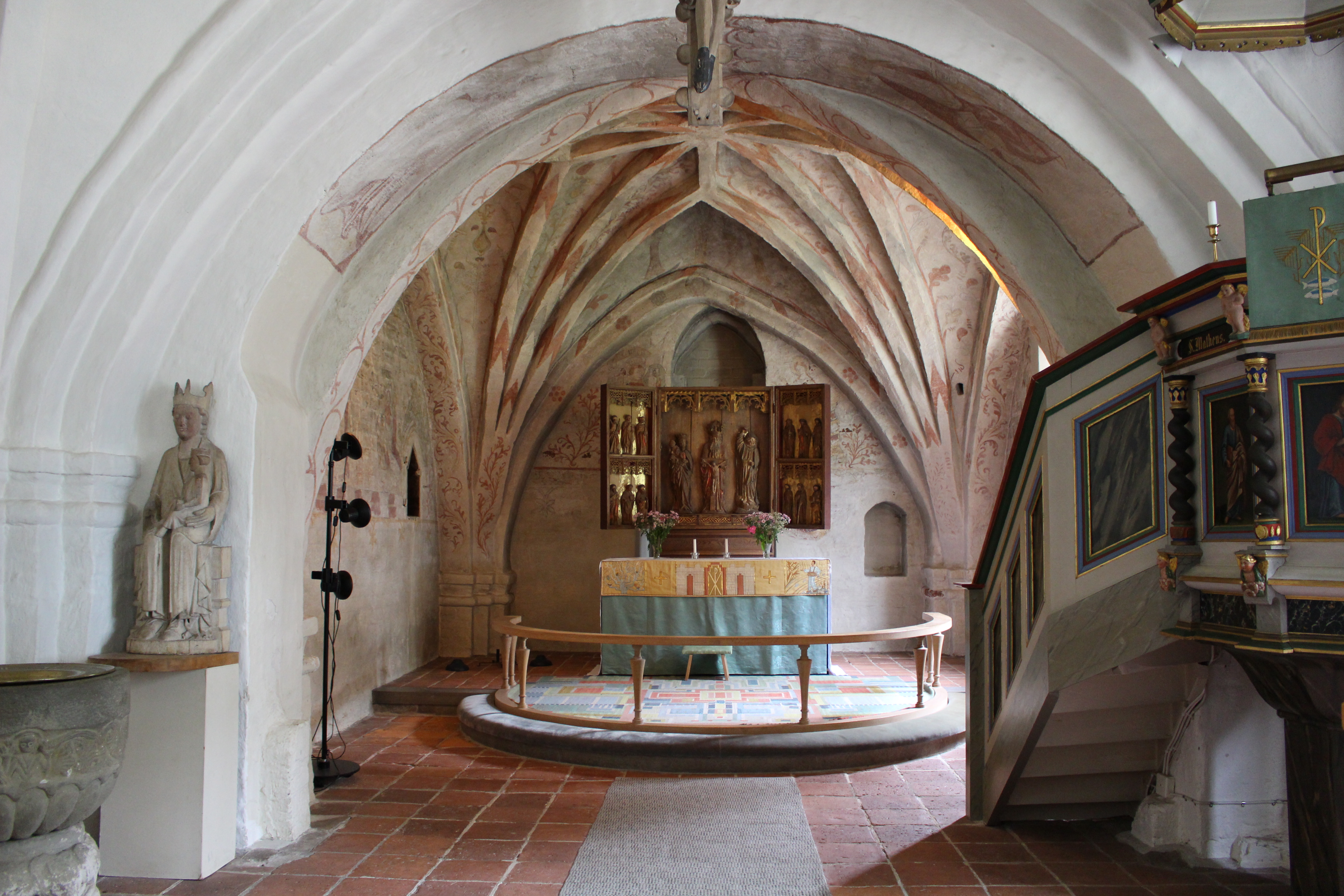
Interior view of the choir

The presently visible church was most probably preceded by a wooden church. A written source speaks about a church in Kiaby being given by Archbishop Eskil of Lund to monks in Vä. The present church was built as a Brick Gothic church in the 1250s, originally with exposed bricks and decorations in the form of blind arches and lesenes. The church still retains the original brick roof over the northern side of the choir roof. The tower with its crow-stepped gables was probably built during the 16th century, and the present-day vaults of the church date from the 15th century. They are decorated with Gothic murals made circa 1475. They have been covered by whitewash but were restored in 1938-39. In 1790 a northern transept was added to the church.

== Furnishings ==
Among the church furnishings, the richly decorated Romanesque baptismal font is the oldest, made of sandstone in the beginning of the 13th century. It may originally have belonged to the possible earlier, wooden church in the same location. The altarpiece is from the early 16th century and probably made in northern Germany; however, it has also been speculated that it may have been made in the nearby monastery of Bäckaskog. It shows great similarities with the altarpiece of neighbouring Oppmanna Church. It displays God with the crucified Christ, flanked by Mary and the archangel Michael in the centre, surrounded by the twelve apostles. The church also contains two other medieval pieces of sculpture. The triumphal cross is made of oak and dates from the 13th century; a peculiarity is the sandals made of silver that Christ is carrying. It has been attributed to the so-called Ignaberg Master, and shows influences from French Gothic art. The same sculptor has also been assumed to have made the wooden Madonna that is placed at the entrance to the choir. The sculpture shows direct influences from the sculptures of Chartres Cathedral in France.

The other furnishings are from the time after the Reformation. A second altarpiece was made in 1730 while the pulpit is from the 17th century.
