= Hässlunda Church =

- Hässlunda kyrka
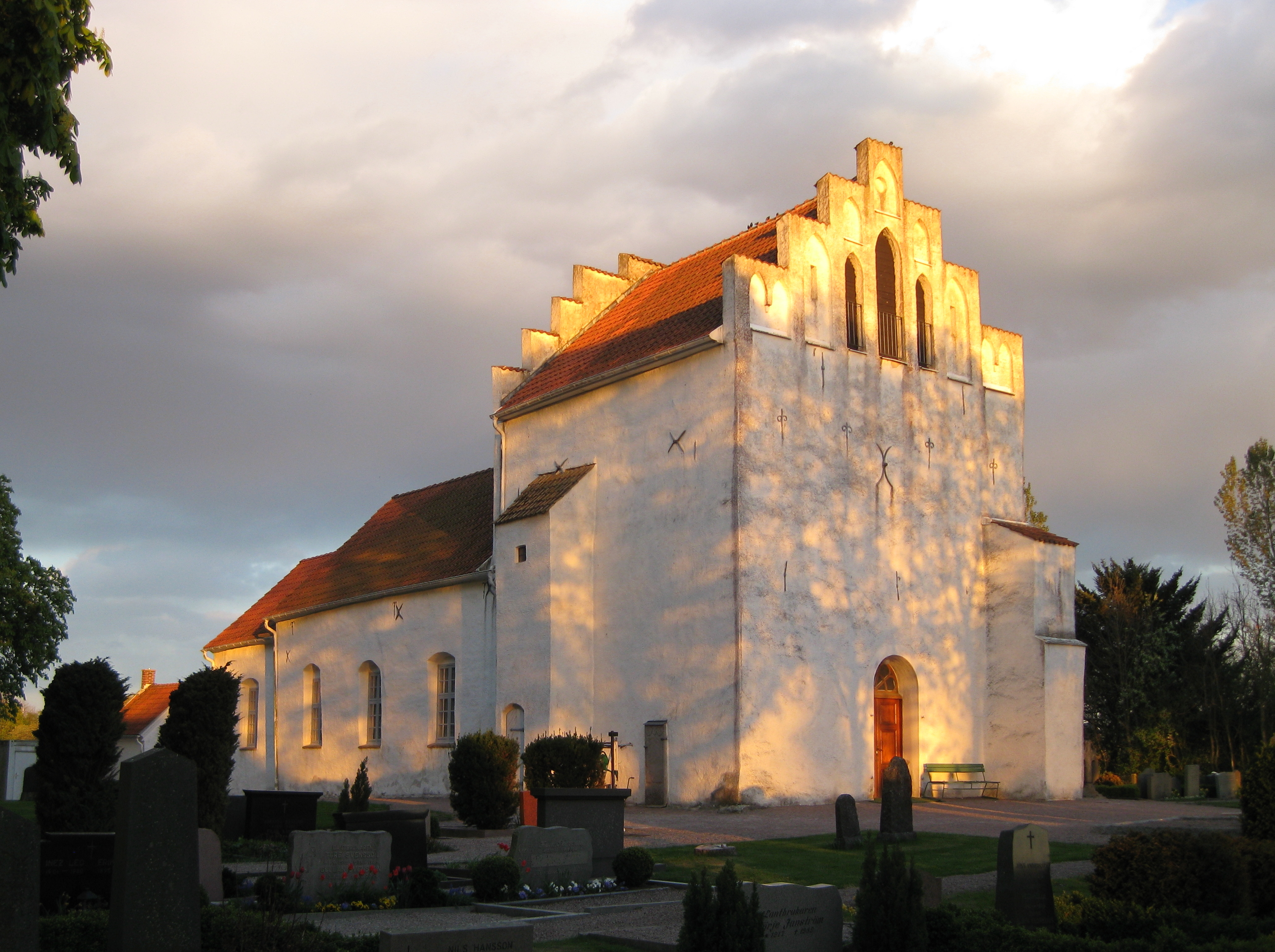
- Hässlunda Church

- 56°01′39″N 12°53′51″E
- Country: Sweden
- Denomination: Church of Sweden

Hässlunda Church (Swedish: Hässlunda kyrka) is a medieval church in Hässlunda, Scania, Sweden.

== History and decoration ==
Hässlunda Church was built around 1250. The church originally lacked a tower, which was added during the 15th century. In the same century, the interior of the church was also altered and an earlier ceiling replaced with vaults. A church porch was also added in front of the south portal of the church. The church was rebuilt between 1864 and 1865. The church porch was demolished, pillars inside the church removed and the vaults altered. A new western entrance was also constructed. The church was renovated in 1932, the roof repaired in 1948 and further minor repairs were made in 1958 and 1975. Restoration work was carried out to protect the medieval murals in 2000.

The church contains a few late medieval murals, among them a depiction of Saint Canute. The pews of the church are from the 18th century, while the richly decorated pulpit dates from 1609. The altarpiece is from 1801 and made by Swedish artist Carl Fredrik Richter.
