= Silvåkra Church =

- Silvåkra kyrka
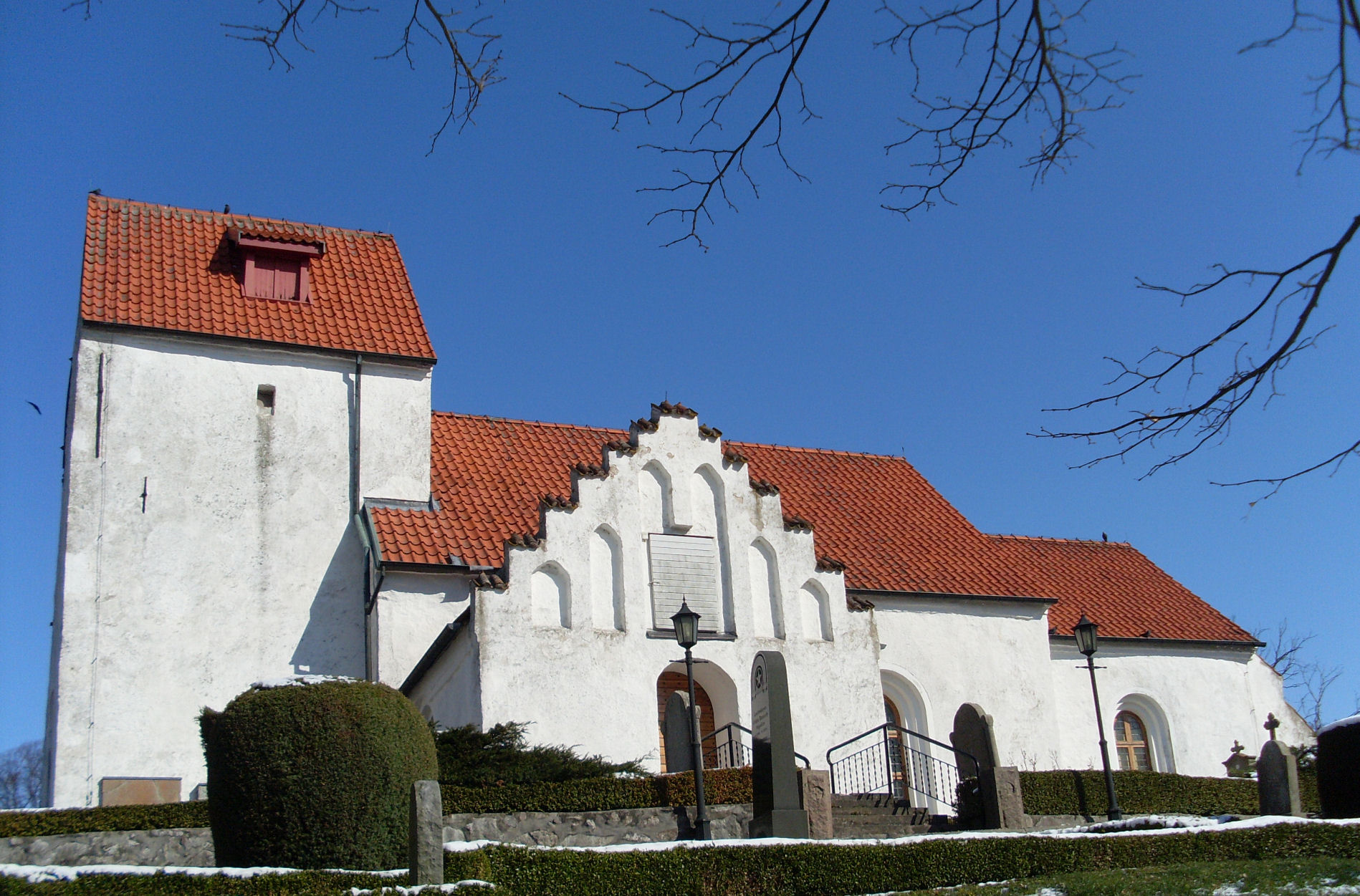
- Silvåkra Church

- 55°41′04″N 13°29′43″E
- Country: Sweden
- Denomination: Church of Sweden

Silvåkra Church (Swedish: Silvåkra kyrka) is a medieval church in Silvåkra, Lund Municipality, Scania, Sweden. The church is decorated with church murals from both the 12th and the 16th centuries, and still has some medieval furnishings.

== History ==
The construction date of the church is not known, but it appears to have been built during the third quarter of the 12th century. The tower, which originally was higher than today, was built somewhat later, probably during the 13th century, while the church porch was added in the 16th century. The vaults of the nave are from the 15th century. Additional changes to the church were made in the 19th century. The ceiling of the chancel was installed in 1839, and in 1868 the church was equipped with new, larger windows. A comprehensive refurbishment of the interior was carried out between 1883 and 1884. Several repairs and restorations have also been made during the 20th and 21st centuries, including a large restoration in 1956, and restorations of the medieval church murals in 1954 and 2001.

== Murals and furnishings ==
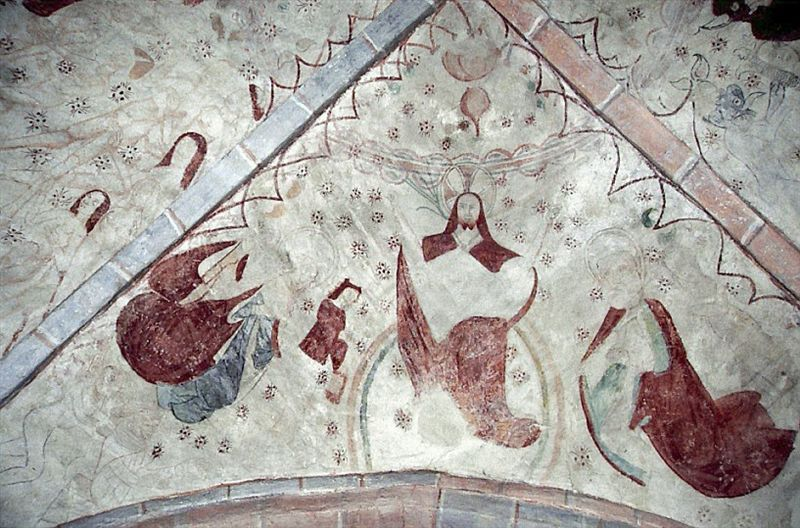
View of the murals in the eastern vault

Medieval paintings were discovered under layers of whitewash in 1951 and subsequently restored. They consist of two separate sets of murals. On the chancel arch there are Romanesque paintings from the construction period of the church, of high artisanal quality. They have been somewhat damaged by the construction of new vaults during the 15th century as well as by being covered by whitewash. Of later date is the set of murals which decorate the four vaults of the nave; they were probably made in the first quarter of the 16th century and are in a Late Gothic style. The southernmost vault contains a depiction of Hell; the western vault the Triumphal entry into Jerusalem of Christ; the northern vault Saint Peter at the gates of Heaven and the easternmost vault contains a depiction of Christ in Majesty with Mary and John the Baptist by his side.

Among the church furnishings, the baptismal font is the oldest, dating from the 12th century. The church also owns two medieval wooden statuettes, one from the 13th century of Mary with the infant Christ, while the other is an early 16th century depiction of either Martin of Tours or Saint George. The pulpit was made in 1578 and altered in 1738. The church bell was made in 1648. The altarpiece dates from 1910.
