= Norra Strö Church =

- Norra Strö kyrka
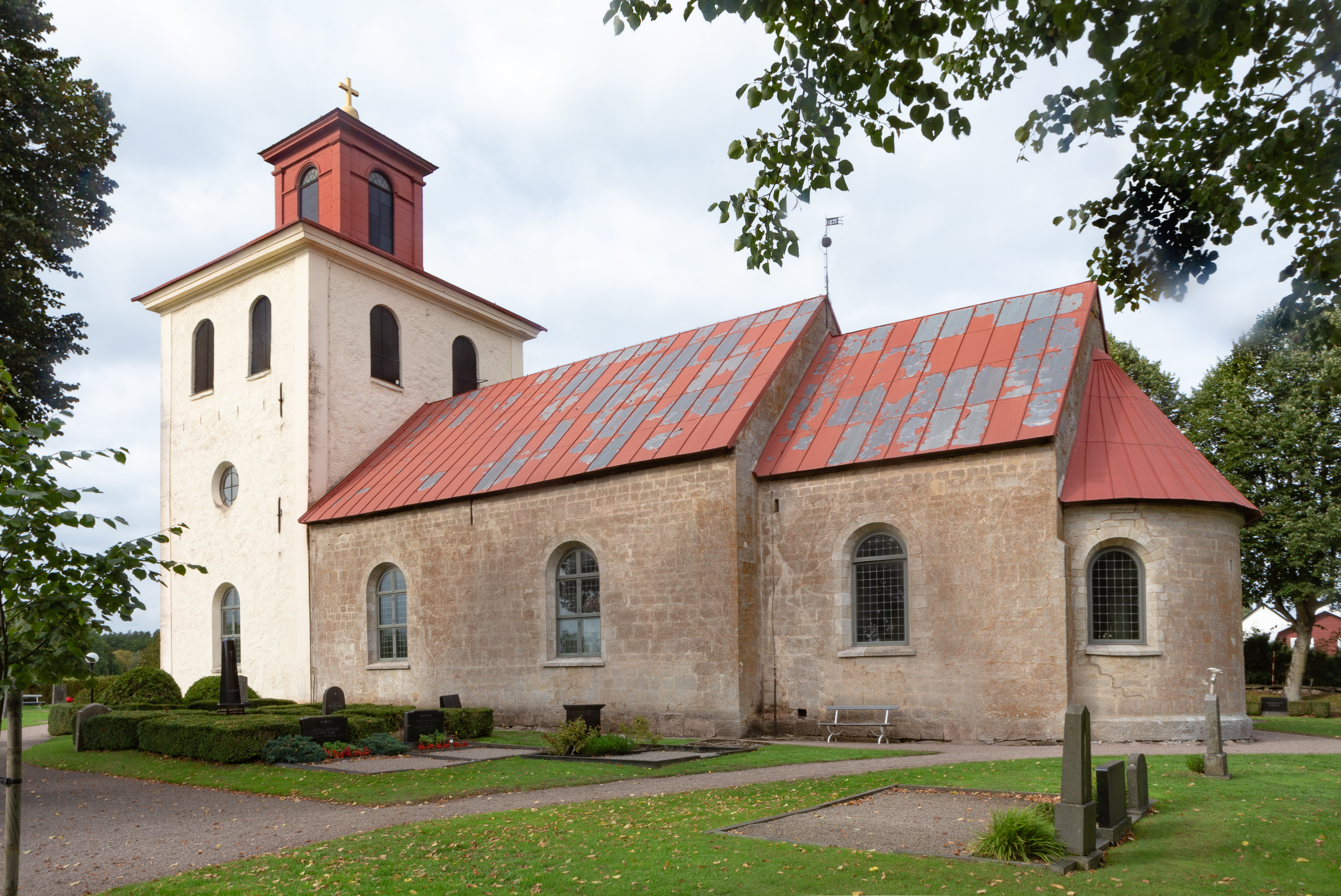
- Norra Strö Church

- Location within Skåne Location within Sweden
- 56°06′32″N 14°01′57″E
- Country: Sweden
- Denomination: Church of Sweden

Norra Strö Church (Swedish: Norra Strö kyrka) is a church in Norra Strö, a village in Kristianstad Municipality, Scania, Sweden. Built during the Middle Ages, it still contains medieval murals as well as a number of historical furnishings. The church was partially rebuilt during the 19th century and renovated in the 1940s. It belongs to the Church of Sweden.

== Description ==
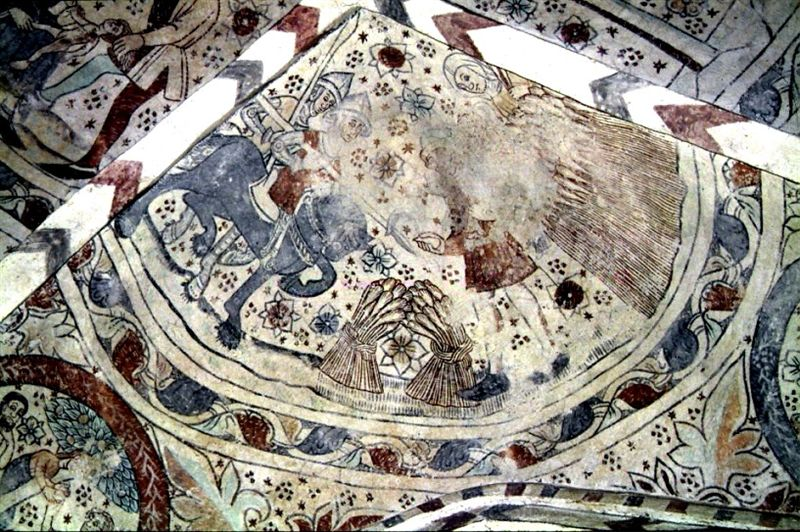
15th-century murals in the vaults of the nave

The church in Norra Strö was built during the 12th or 13th century. The nave, apse and chancel are the oldest parts of the church, made of finely hewn sandstone blocks. During the 15th century, the interior was altered and new vaults constructed and decorated with murals. A church porch was built during the 16th century, but demolished in 1837 when the tower was built, replacing an earlier free-standing belfry. At the same time, a new sacristy was built, the windows enlarged and the north and south entrances closed. A renovation was made in 1946–1947, led by architect Knut Nordenskjöld. At this time the church murals were restored. Further repairs were carried out in 2000 and 2003.

The church murals are from two different periods; those in the nave were made in connection with the construction of the vaults in the 15th century, while another group of murals in the apse are from the period 1250–1300 and depict a row of apostles. Among the furnishings, the baptismal font is the oldest, a granite font from the 13th century. The pulpit is from the 1590s, and the altarpiece from 1601; the latter contains the coat of arms of King Christian IV of Denmark. The pews date from the late 19th century.

The church belongs to the Church of Sweden, and is part of Araslövs församling (Araslöv parish).
