= Östra Herrestad Church =

- Östra Herrestads kyrka
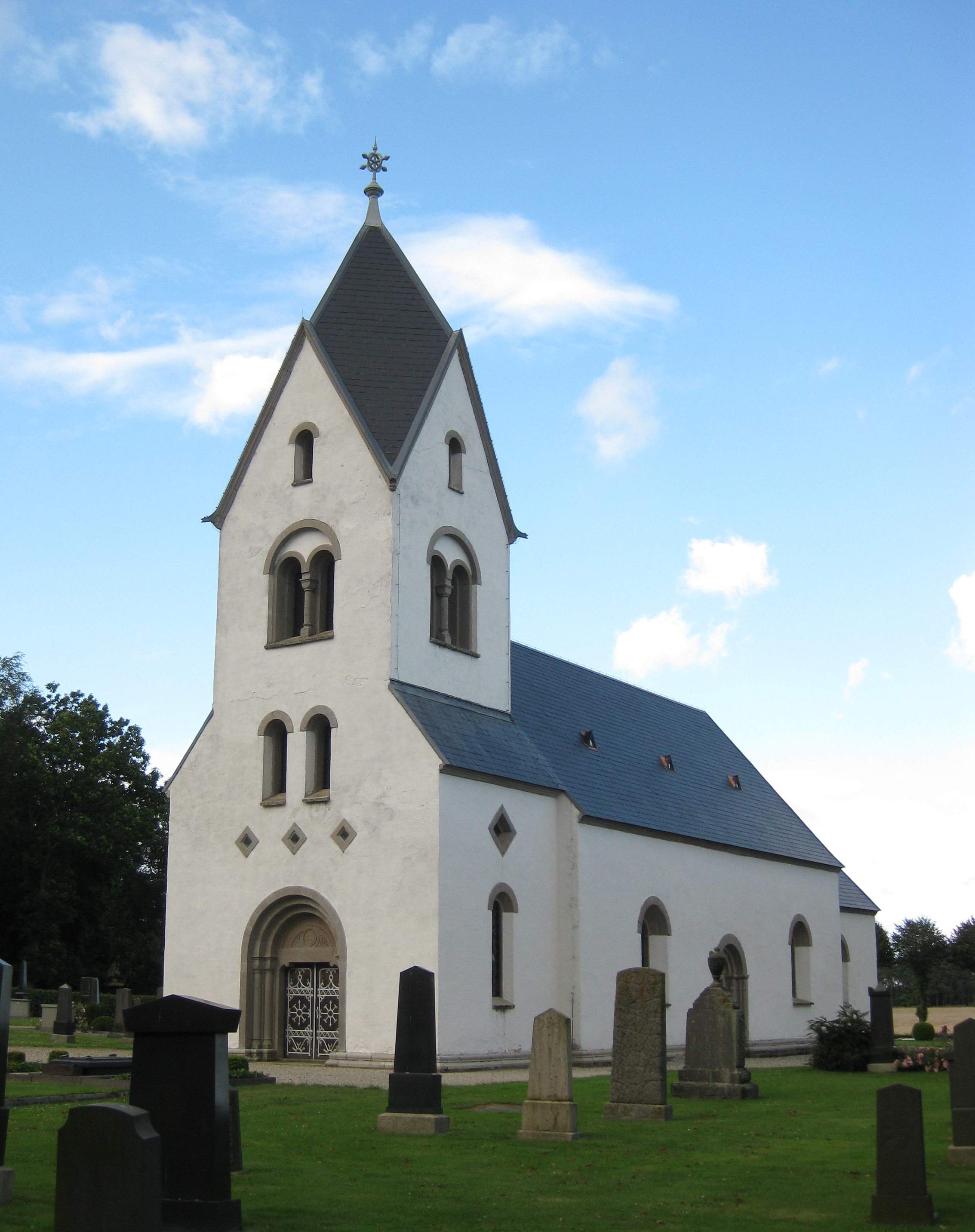
- Östra Herrestad Church

- 55°31′34″N 14°09′59″E
- Country: Sweden
- Denomination: Church of Sweden

Östra Herrestad Church (Swedish: Östra Herrestads kyrka) is a medieval church in Östra Herrestad, Simrishamn Municipality, Sweden. It belongs to a group of Romanesque churches built by Carl stenmästare, a master stone mason educated at the building site of Lund Cathedral. The church is richly decorated with 16th-century murals inside.

== History and architecture ==
The church dates from the middle of the 12th century, and was built by Carl stenmästare, a master stone mason who has signed the tympanum above the main, Romanesque entrance with his name. Stylistic comparisons suggest he was educated at the construction site of Lund Cathedral, built earlier in the same century, and may originally have come from Gotland. The same master stone mason was involved in the construction of several other churches in Scania and on Bornholm, but Östra Hererstad Church is the only church in which he left his signature. The church originally consisted of a nave, chancel and an apse. The church was probably commissioned by a local magnate. In the 15th century, the vaults were constructed, replacing an earlier ceiling. Between 1888 and 1889 the church was renovated and rebuilt to plans by Henrik Sjöström. It received new furnishings, was enlarged towards the west and the tower was rebuilt.

Inside, the church has also retained a few fragments of the original Romanesque church. The vaults of the church are profusely decorated with church murals from the early 16th century. In the nave, there are depictions from Genesis, the Coronation of the Virgin, and the Last Judgment. The chancel contains scenes from the life of Christ, and the apse is dominated by a representation of God the Father, holding the crucified Christ. The sacristy contains murals depicting the Twelve Apostles. The furnishings date mostly from the 19th century, with the exception of the baptismal font which was made in the 14th century.
