= Gothem Church =

- Gothem kyrka
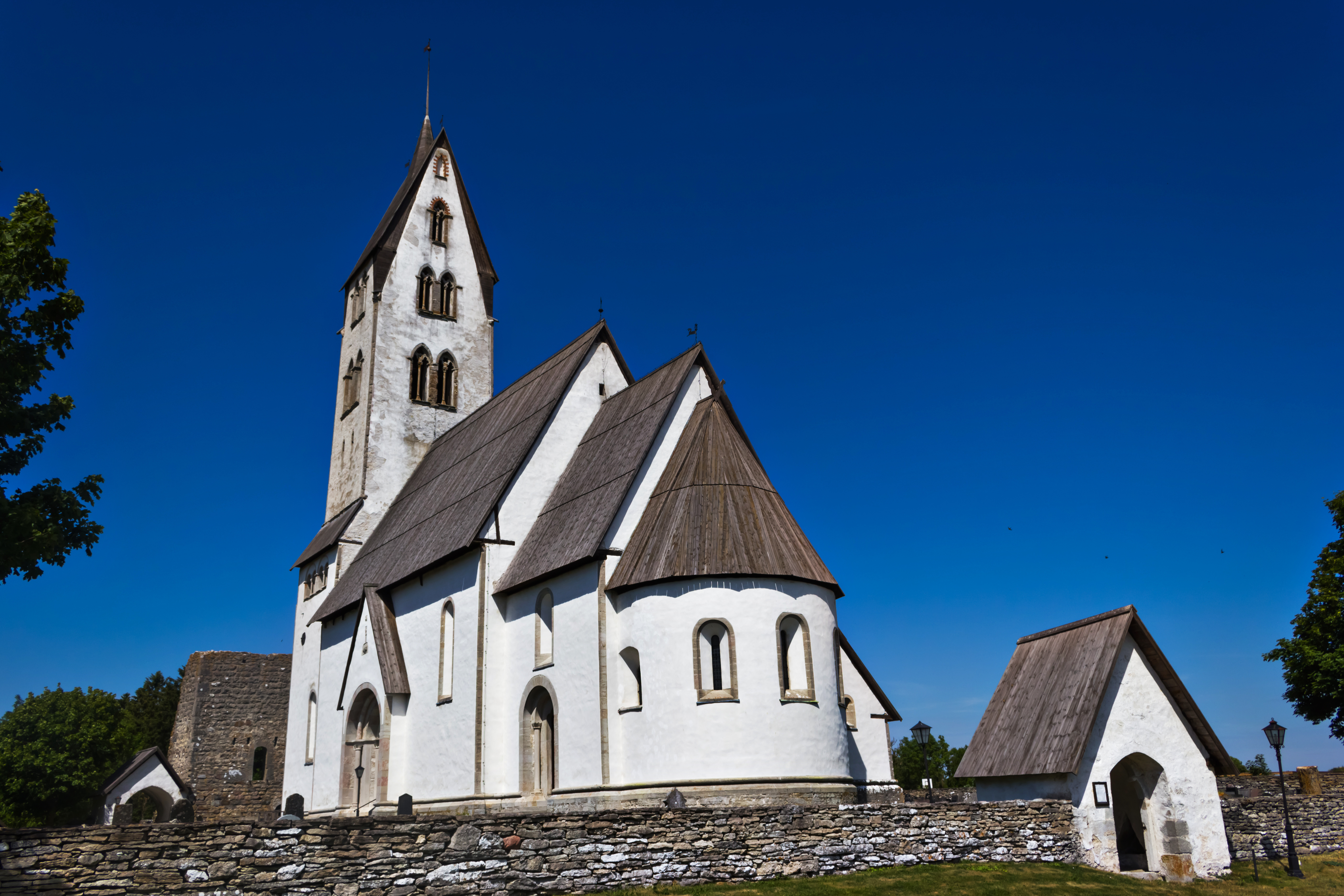
- Gothem Church, view of the exterior

- Location on Gotland
- 57°34′31″N 18°44′06″E
- Country: Sweden
- Denomination: Church of Sweden

Administration
- Diocese: Visby

Gothem Church (Swedish: Gothems kyrka) is a medieval church in Gothem on the Swedish island of Gotland. Gothic in style, it has remained largely unaltered since the 14th century. It lies in the Diocese of Visby.

== History ==
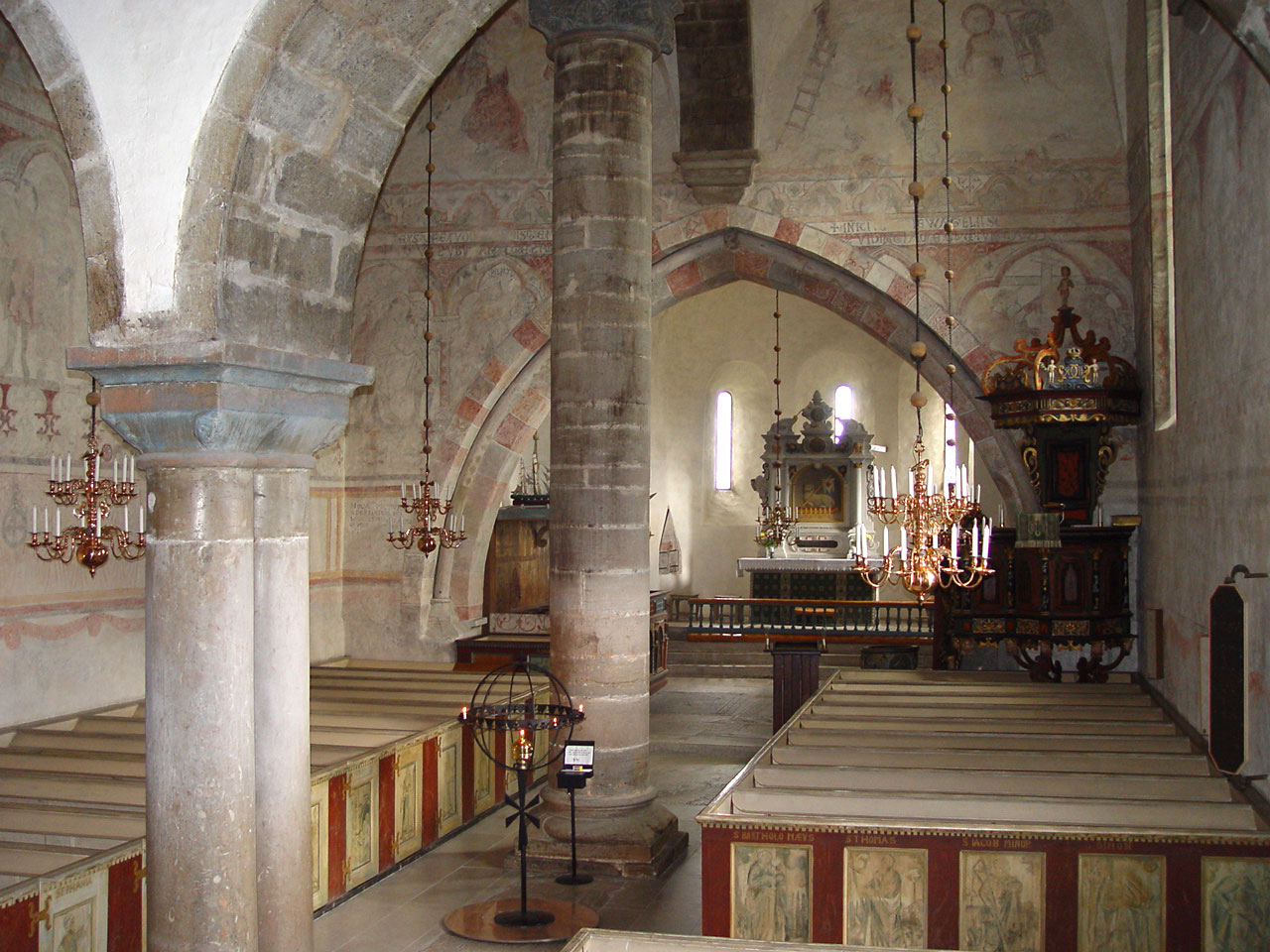
View of the interior

The presently visible, Gothic church is probably the successor of two earlier churches, the first a stave church or at least a wooden church, which was later replaced by a Romanesque stone church. Rebuilding of the church into its present form was carried out between the early 13th and mid-14th centuries. The church may originally have been built to serve a large farmstead. Since its completion during the 14th century, the church has remained largely unaltered.

== Architecture ==
The church has a tall and slender western toward which contains a single bell, built by the Gothic builder workshop known by its notname Egypticus, which was active on Gotland during the time period 1330-1380. The nave is divided into two by a single column, and the choir ends in an apse. During a restoration in the 1950s, medieval murals were uncovered. They now again completely dominate the interior of the church. They are partly designed as imitations of drapery and tapestries, and partly depict biblical scenes and other figures (including knights and footmen fighting). They date from c. 1300 and were probably executed by an anonymous German artist.

The church also incorporates a choir bench from the first half of the 14th century and a church bell from 1374; otherwise, most of the furniture is later, Baroque in style.

Close to the church are the relatively well-preserved ruins of a defensive tower dating from the 12th century, built as a place for protection for the congregation during times of war or danger.
