= Vä =

Coordinates: 55°59′48″N 14°05′23″E

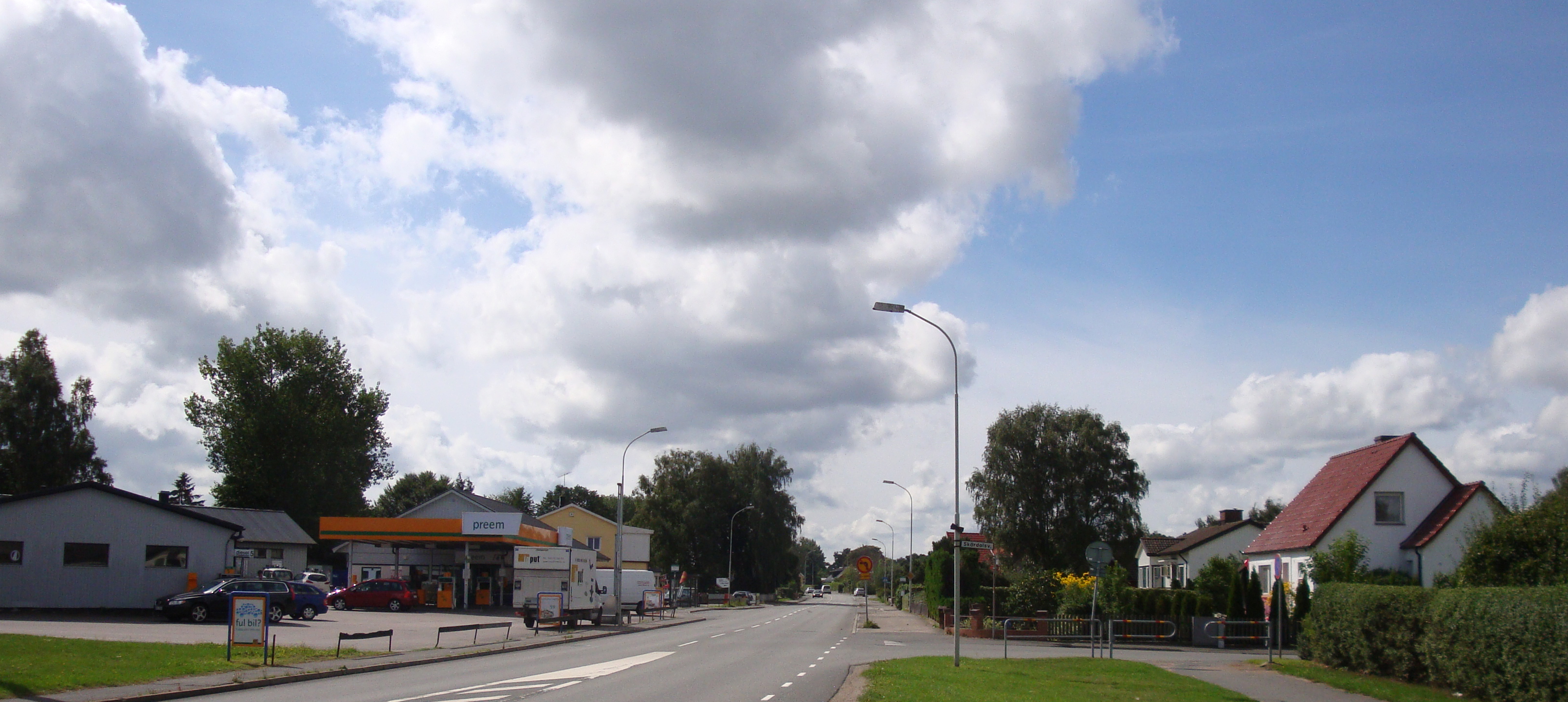
Central Vä in August 2010

Vä is a former town in Scania, now a village in the municipality of Kristianstad in Sweden, ca 5 km southwest of the town of Kristianstad.

== History ==
The name stems from the early Danish word væ, meaning "cult place" or "holy ground".

Vä Church is one of the oldest stone churches in Sweden, and contains some of the oldest and most monumental church murals in Sweden.

The first written mention of Vä as a town is from the 1250s, but the place is mentioned in the Danish Census Book by the king Valdemar II as early as the early 13th century. The town has been burnt many times. Notable burnings include those by Karl Knutsson in 1452, Svante Sture in 1509, and by Charles, Duke of Södermanland, later king Charles IX, in 1569.

In 1612, the Swedish king Gustaf II Adolf burned Vä. Vä was the largest settlement of 24 Danish parishes the young Swedish king burned down.

The destroyed town was replaced two years later by the Danish king Christian IV with "Christianstad", which was built in 1614 on the island of Allø, today Kristianstad. The destroyed Vä lost its privileges as a town and became a substitute for farmers from the nearby villages of Næsby and Nosaby, who had to give up land to build Kristianstad, along with the former town of Åhus.

Today, there are some remains of the former church buildings. In addition to the church, there is also an old wall with pillars and a brick cairn, once the old church of Saint Gertrude, and remains of old streets.

== Sources ==
- Nordisk Familjebok
- Salmonsens konversationslexikon
