= Lackalänga Church =

- Lackalänga kyrka
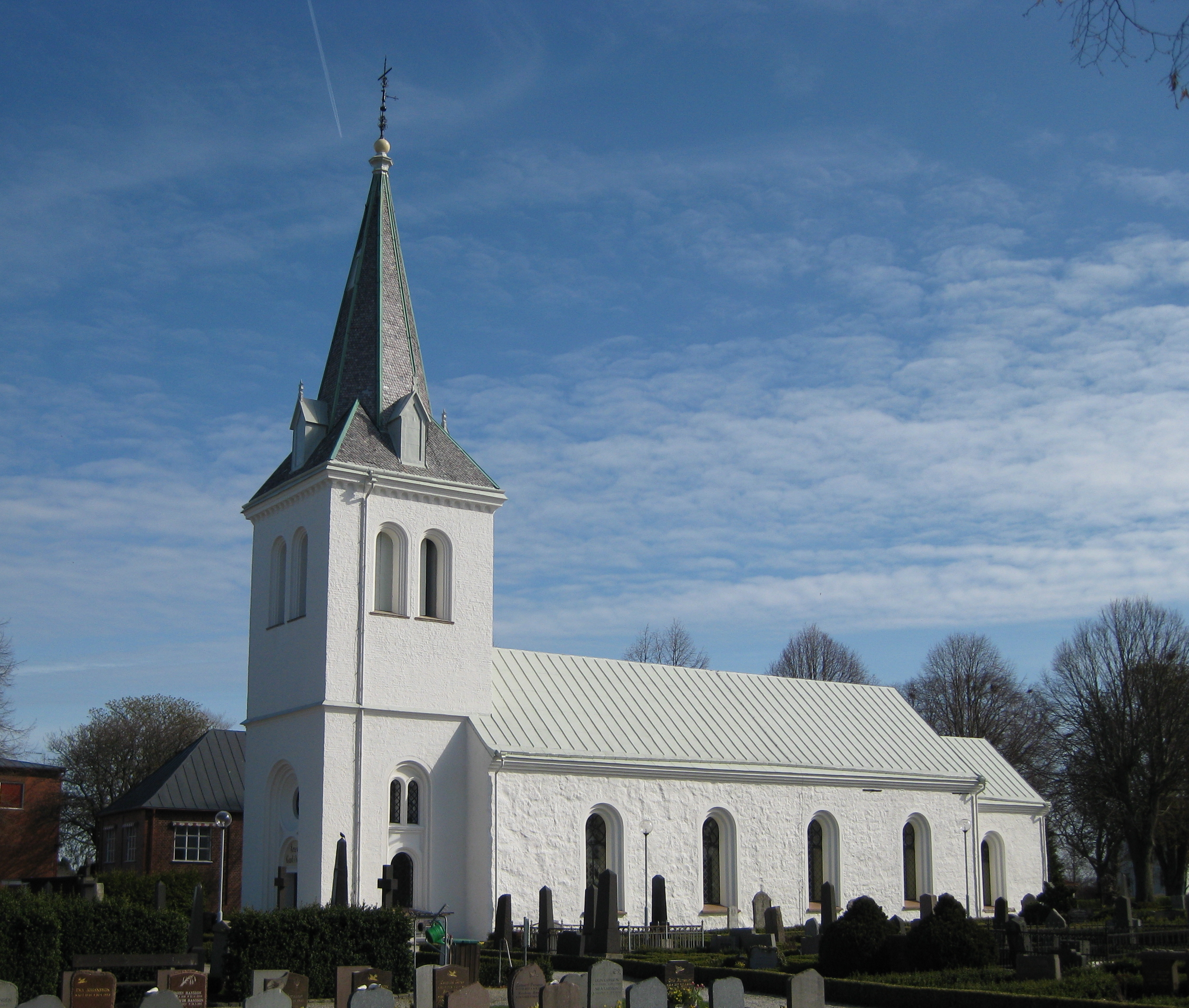
- Lackalänga Church

- 55°46′27″N 13°06′33″E
- Country: Sweden
- Denomination: Church of Sweden

Lackalänga Church (Swedish: Lackalänga kyrka) is a church in Furulund, Kävlinge Municipality, Skåne County, Sweden. It contains some of the most well-preserved early medieval church murals in Sweden.

== History ==
A stone church consisting of nave, choir and apse was built here during the second half of the 12th century. The builder was probably Carl stenmästare. In the 15th century, the church ceiling was replaced with vaults, and two church porches (later demolished) were built. In 1844 Carl Georg Brunius presented designs for rebuilding the church, and in 1850–51 the church was enlarged. The old windows were replaced with the current ones, and a tower was constructed. A new tower was however built as soon as 1888, since it was feared that the smaller tower designed by Brunius would not be sturdy enough to bear the weight of the church bells.

== Architecture and furnishings ==
The medieval church, the apse and choir, and parts of the 15th century vaulting, still exist. The chancel arch is unusually broad and tall. There are remains of a wall which once separated the choir from the nave, a feature mostly found in medieval cathedrals but rarely in countryside churches like Lackalänga. The apse contains some of southern Sweden's most well-preserved early medieval wall paintings. They date from the early 13th century and depict Christ in Majesty surrounded by a mandorla, flanked by symbols of the four Evangelists. Other figures, including Mary also decorate the apse. The murals were discovered by Nils Månsson Mandelgren in 1872 under layers of whitewash and restored in 1949. The church also contains traces of murals from the 16th century in the choir vault.

The baptismal font of the church is probably as old as the church itself. The church is also in possession of two medieval candle holders made brass. The altarpiece and pulpit are both from the late 16th century, although the altarpiece was re-painted in the 18th century. The church bells date from 1747 and 1788, respectively. The church organ is from 1889 and was renovated in 1952.
