= Övraby Church =

- Övraby kyrka
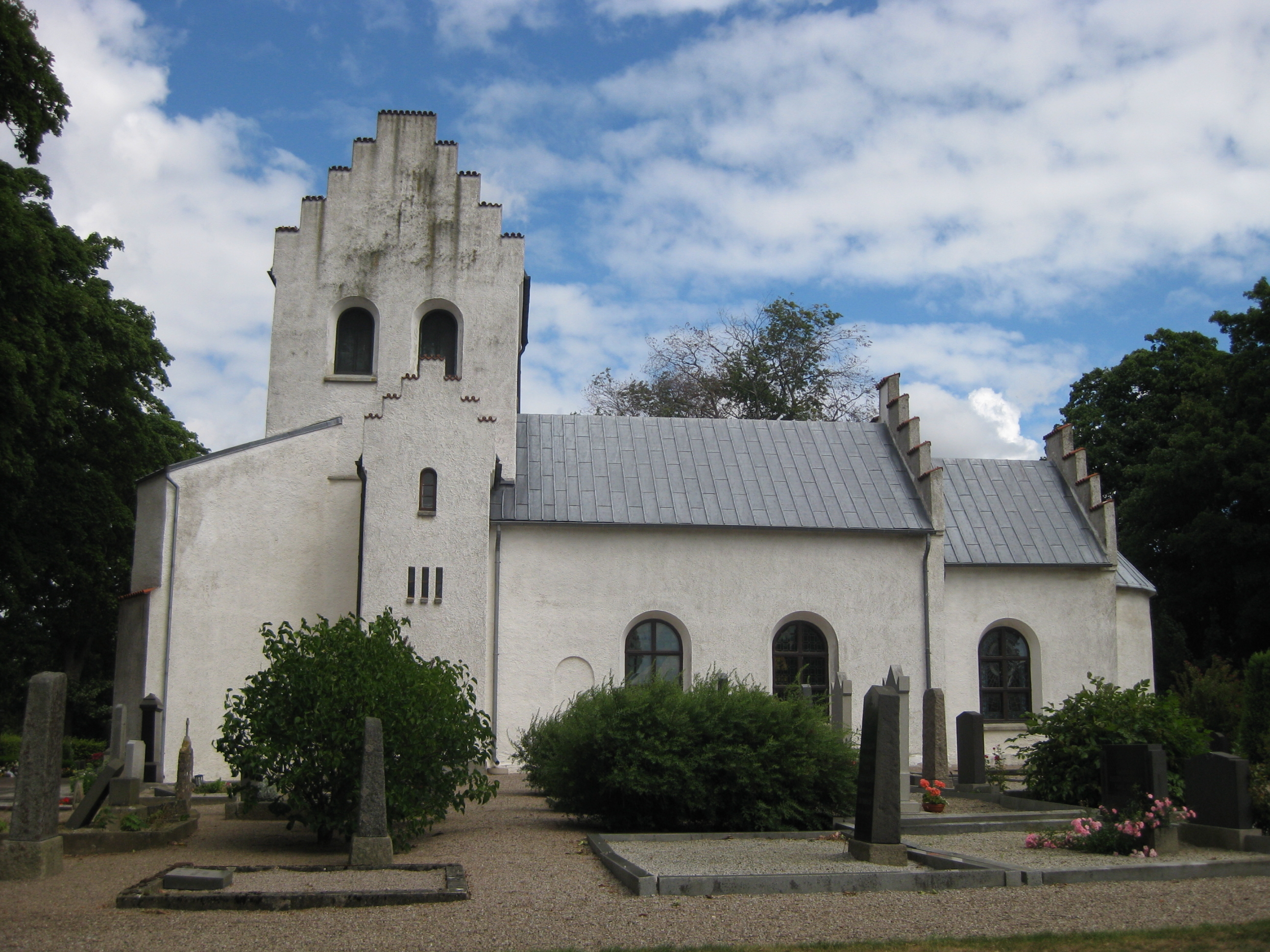
- Övraby Church

- 55°30′11″N 13°57′08″E
- Country: Sweden
- Denomination: Church of Sweden

Administration
- Diocese: Lund

Övraby Church (Swedish: Övraby kyrka) is a medieval church in Tomelilla Municipality, Scania, Sweden.

== History ==
Övraby Church was built at the end of the 12th century. It originally consisted of a nave, choir and apse. During the Middle Ages the church was enlarged. The tower was built during the 13th century, and the north church porch dates from the 14th century. In the 15th century, an earlier ceiling was replaced with vaults. At the end of the 19th century, the church had become too small for the congregation. Plans were made to demolish the church and build a new, larger one, but the architect Theodor Wåhlin managed to convince the congregation to instead repair the old church. The renovation was carried out in 1908–09. Subsequent repairs have been made in 1967, 1993 and 1995.

== Murals and furnishings ==
Övraby Church contains some of the most well-preserved medieval murals in Romanesque style in Scania. They were uncovered in 1903 from under layers of whitewash. In the apse is a depiction of Christ in Majesty, surrounded by angels and symbols of the Four Evangelists. Below is a row of saints. The style is influenced by contemporary art on continental Europe and the murals contain unusual details such as sculpted elements of stucco and details enhanced by the application of copper. They are believed to be from the middle of the 12th century.

The interior of the church is otherwise characterised by the changes made by Wåhlin in the early 20th century. The choir ceiling, wall decorations and pews were all made at his initiative. The altarpiece and pulpit both date from the late 17th century and the baptismal font is medieval, though altered during the renovation of Wåhlin.
