= Rasbokil Church =

Coordinates: 59°59′34″N 17°51′37″E

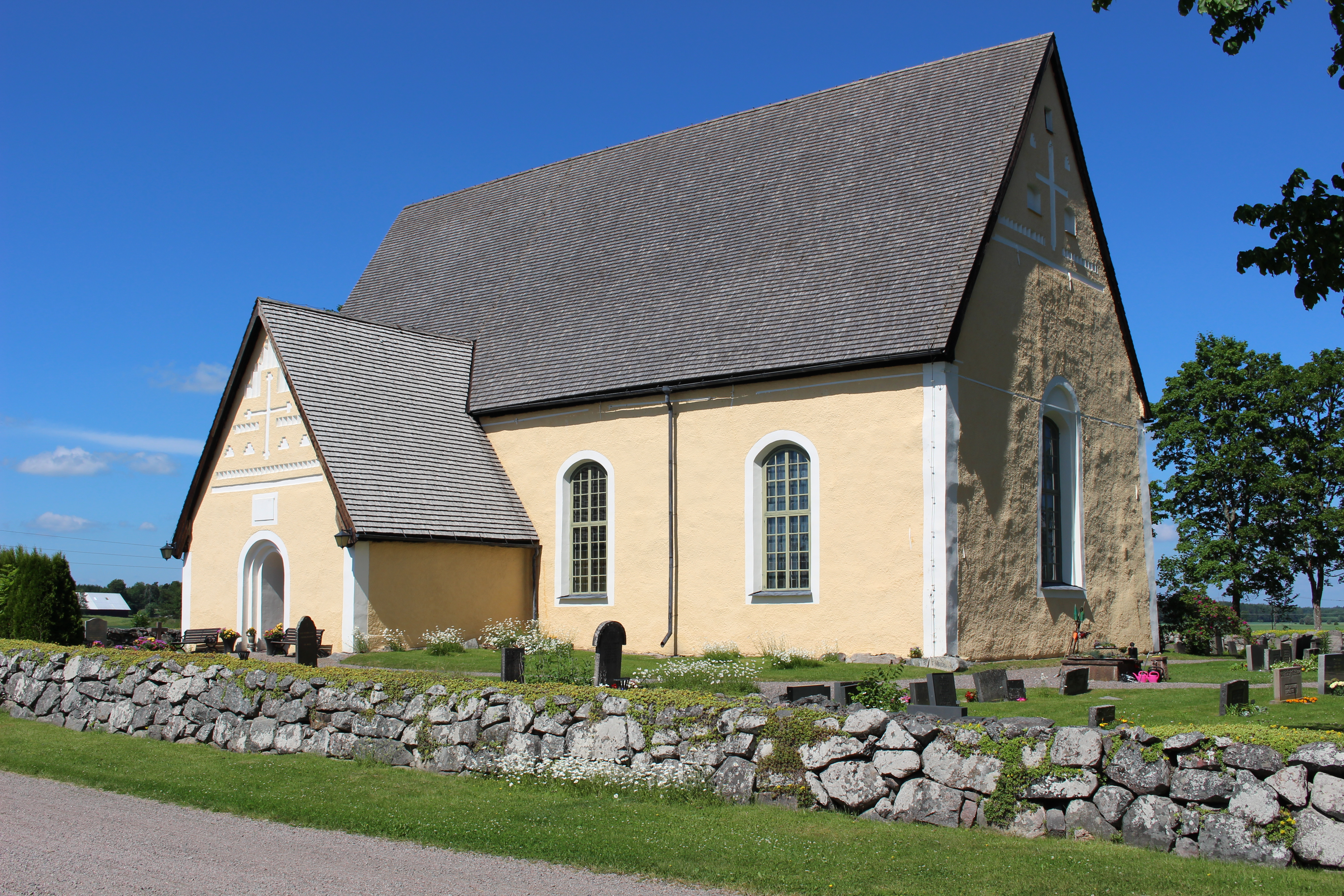
Rasbokil Church, view of the exterior

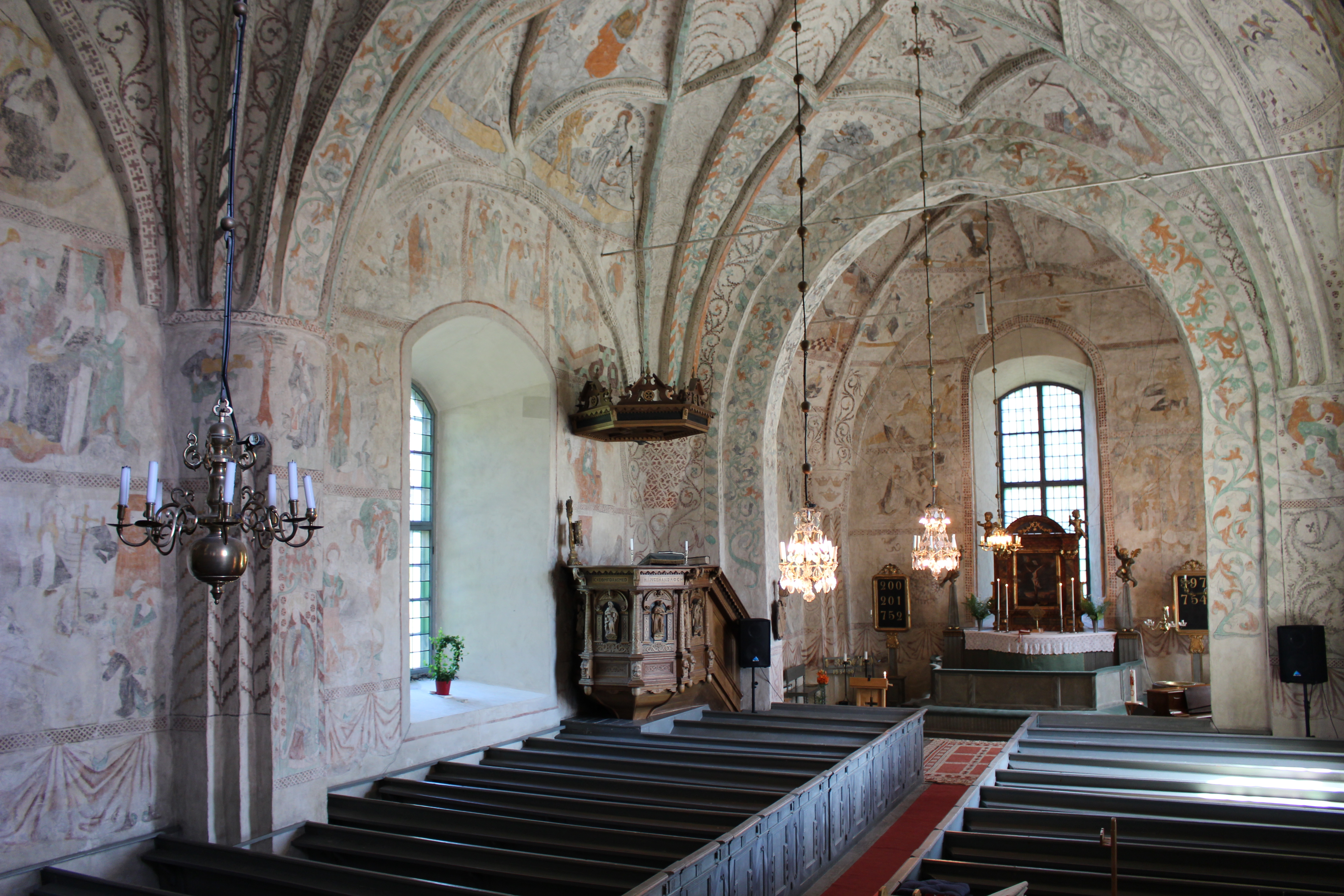
Rasbokil Church, view of the interior

Rasbokil Church (Swedish: Rasbokils kyrka) is a medieval church located north-east of Uppsala in Uppsala County, Sweden. It is part of the Archdiocese of Uppsala (Church of Sweden).

== History and architecture ==
The church appears to have been preceded by an earlier church, possibly a wooden church, and stones from an earlier building have been incorporated into the presently visible building. The current church was built at the end of the 15th century or around 1500 and has retained its original appearance largely unchanged. During the 18th century most of the windows were enlarged and the vaulting of the church repaired; at that time the frescos were also covered with whitewash, only to be uncovered and restored during a renovation in 1909-10 under the guidance of architect Sigurd Curman. A window was also made in the north wall of the church in 1870. The church is one of very few medieval churches in Sweden which has never been substantially rebuilt or altered.

The church is constructed of fieldstone with decorated brick gables. It has a yellow exterior with details painted white and the steep gable roof has a covering of shingle. The church has a simple floor-plan consisting of a single nave with two sections of star-shaped vaults, followed by a choir of equal width with a ceiling supported by a rib vault. The design is typical for countryside churches in Uppland built during the Middle Ages. The vaults were decorated with frescos probably during the 1520s by an anonymous workshop sometimes referred to as Rasbokilsmästaren ("the Rasbokil master"). In comparison with other church frescos in Sweden, some of the frescos have unusual themes, including e.g. depictions of the family trees of Jesus and Mary. The frescos have been described as being of "distinguished quality".

Most of the church's furnishings date from the time after the Reformation. These include the pulpit, which is from 1648 and given as a gift to the church by Colonel Jurgen Schildt after his homecoming from the Thirty Years' War. The altarpiece is also from the 17th century; its top part with a painting was restored in the 1930s after its Baroque frame was found in pieces in the belfry of the church. The decorated door of the church porch dates from the reign of King Gustav III of Sweden and the organ is from 1829.
