= Vä Church =

12th-century Romanesque church in Vä, Sweden

- Vä kyrka
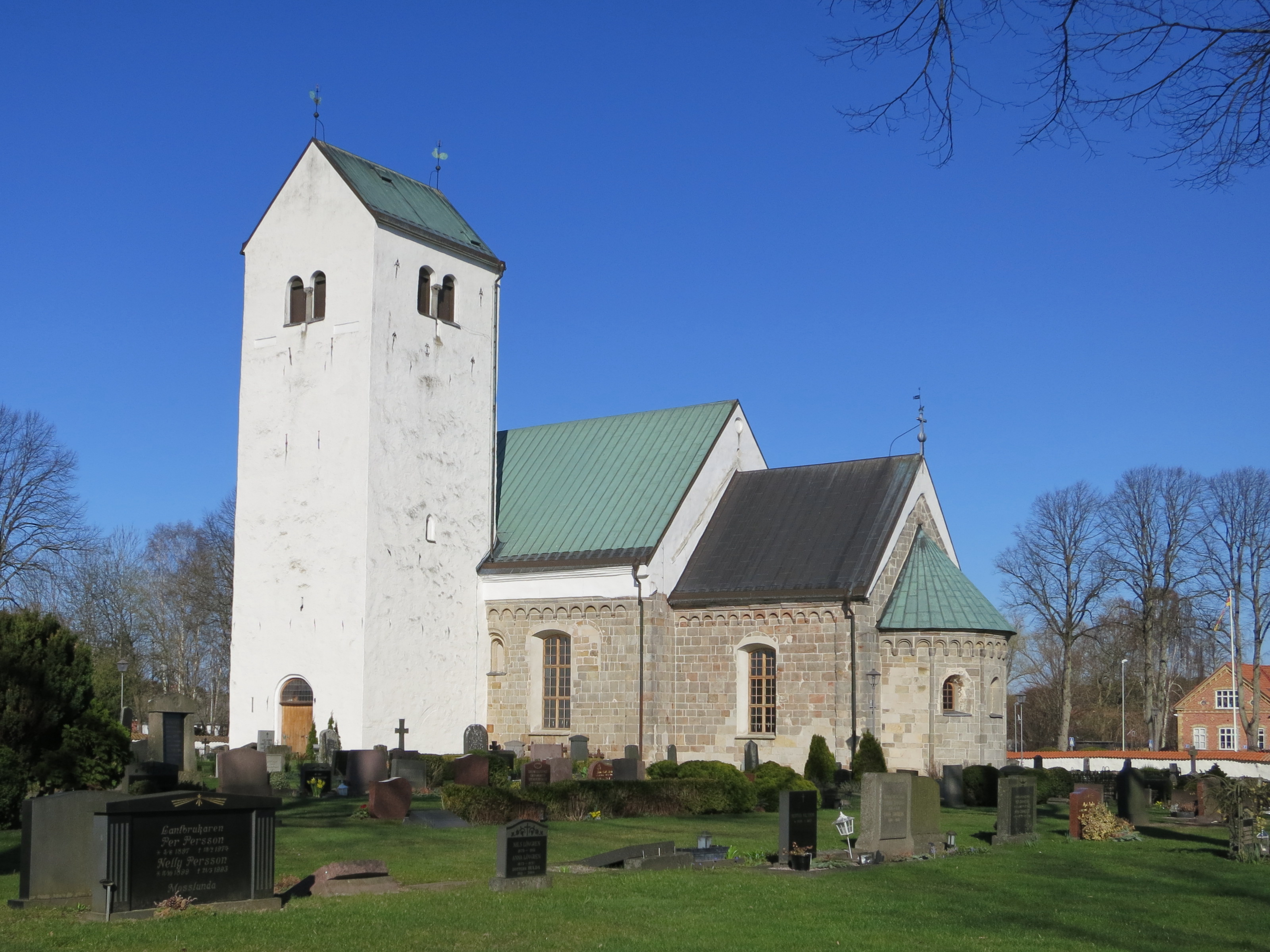
- Vä Church, view from south west

- Location within Skåne Location within Sweden Location within Europe
- 55°59′30″N 14°05′14″E
- Country: Sweden
- Denomination: Church of Sweden

Vä Church (Swedish: Vä kyrka), sometimes also called Saint Mary's Church in Vä (Mariakyrkan i Vä) is a well-preserved Romanesque church in Vä, in the southern Swedish province of Scania. It belongs to the Church of Sweden and is a listed building. It was built in the early 12th century, at a time when Scania was part of Denmark. The building was commissioned by a member of the Danish royal family, probably Queen Margaret Fredkulla. The church originally consisted of a nave, a chancel with an apse and two western towers. Quite soon after being finished, it was donated to Premonstratensian monks who used it as the church of their monastery until 1213. It simultaneously functioned as the parish church of Vä. At the end of the Middle Ages, a third tower was built, and in 1593 the building was enlarged. At the beginning of the 19th century, the western towers were demolished. A major restoration was carried out in the 1960s.

The church is one of the oldest stone churches in Sweden and shows several similarities with Lund Cathedral, built at approximately the same time. Although some of the original stone sculptures have been destroyed, some remain. The interior contains some of the oldest church murals in Sweden. These decorate the chancel and the apse. In the chancel, the barrel vault ceiling is decorated with figures carrying speech scrolls of the Christian hymn Te Deum, a subject matter not found elsewhere among medieval murals in Sweden. The apse is dominated by a mural depicting Christ in Majesty.

== Location and surroundings ==
The church is located on a small hill south of a small brook. It is situated within its own cemetery. During the Middle Ages the town of Vä, surrounding the church, was a locally important centre of trade and enjoyed town privileges. It was, like the rest of the province of Scania, part of Denmark until the Treaty of Roskilde in 1658. After having been pillaged by Swedish troops, the Danish King Christian IV decided to move the settlement to a more easily defended location. In 1614 Vä was degraded to the status of village, while most of the population moved to the newly founded city Kristianstad, approximately 7 kilometres (4.3 miles) away.

== History ==
=== Foundation and construction ===
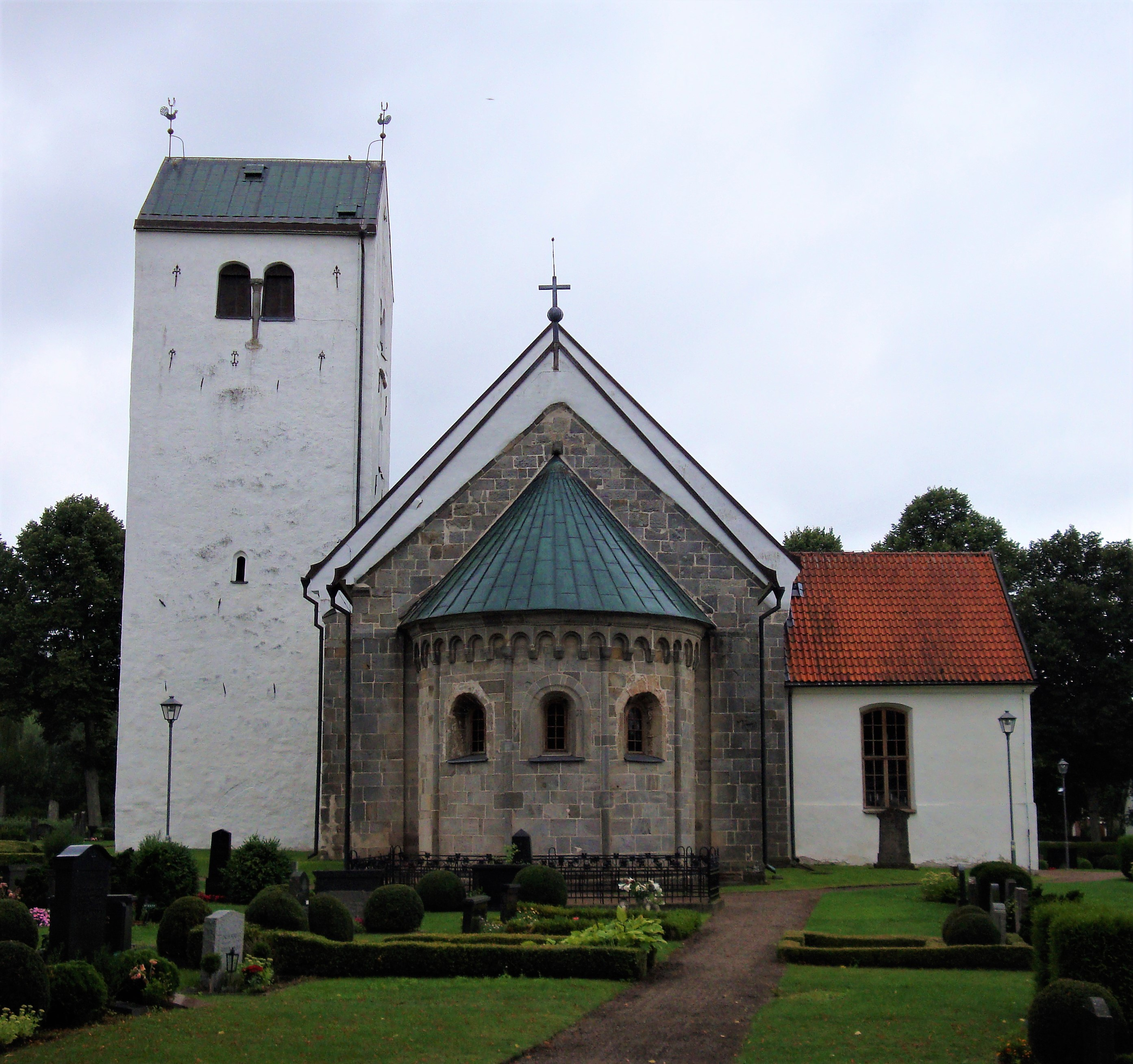
View of the church from the east, showing the well-preserved original apse

Vä Church is one of the oldest stone churches in Scania. Several letters of donation from the 12th century, preserved through later copies, show that the church was donated by the Danish queen consort Sophia of Minsk and the king, Valdemar I of Denmark, to Premonstratensian monks some time after its construction. Contrary to what was common practice at the time, the letters of donation mention her name together with that of the king. This may indicate that the church and its incomes were the personal inheritance of the queen, rather than the king.

The church thus clearly belonged to the Danish royal family prior to the donation, but it is not known who commissioned the building and its age has been the matter of discussion. When it was renovated in the 1960s, a scrap of parchment was discovered in a lead box concealed in the medieval altar, bearing a date which has been interpreted as 1131. Archaeologists have assumed that this date refers to the dedication of the church. Among the preserved murals there are two donor portraits of a king and a queen. Unusually, these depict the queen as the main donor of the church. Queen Margaret Fredkulla died around 1130, and had family connections to the Kievan Rus' and the Byzantine Empire, which could explain the strong influences of Byzantine art in the architecture of the building. There is also a faint inscription in runes in the chancel. Although difficult to interpret, it may contain the names of some close relatives to the queen. For these reasons it is assumed that the church was commissioned by Margaret Fredkulla. Earlier theories put forward King Canute V, King Niels or Queen Richeza as possible builders. It was originally dedicated to Saint Mary and probably built nearby a royal estate.

=== Further changes ===
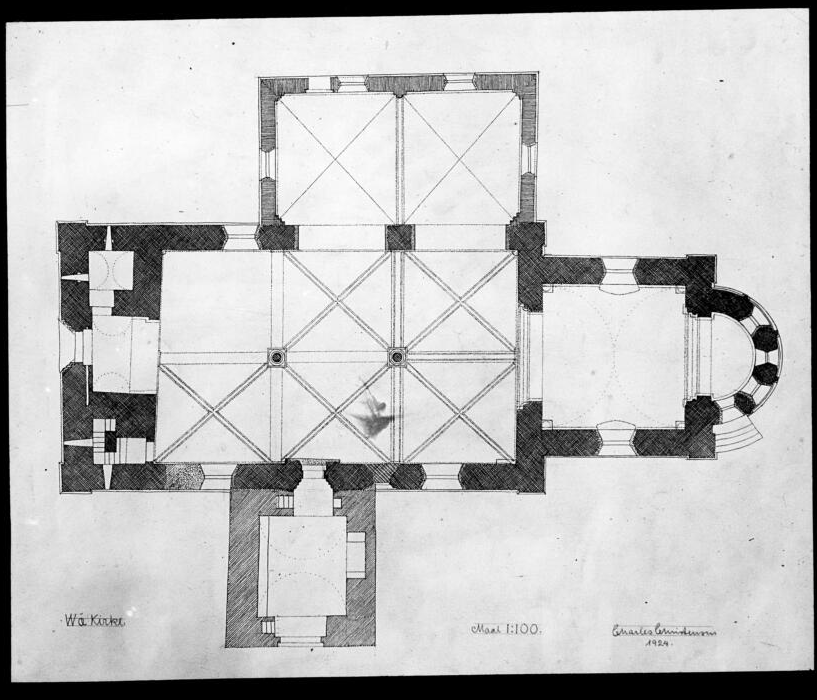
Ground plan of the church: original parts in black, later additions in grey

The church originally consisted of a nave with a flat wooden roof, two western towers, a western entrance and a barrel vaulted chancel with an apse. It was possibly built in two stages, and finished by the time it was donated to the Premonstratensians in the 1160s. It then served as the church of their monastery and simultaneously functioned as the parish church of the borough of Vä, probably during the entire Middle Ages. The Premonstratensians made few changes to the church. A southern entrance was created, the west entrance altered and, possibly, a rood screen installed. A fire ravaged the building in 1213, and after this the monks moved away to found a new monastery on the site of present-day Bäckaskog Castle.

During the 13th century, the vaults were constructed, replacing the wooden ceiling of the nave, and the walls were made slightly higher and the gables steeper. A third tower, the only one still preserved, was built at the end of the Middle Ages to house the church bells. The church was extended towards the north in 1593. The windows, which were successively enlarged during several centuries, probably attained their current shape in 1781. In 1804 the two western towers were demolished, and the church was again damaged by fire in 1810. Several proposals to restore the by then rather dilapidated building were put forward during 19th century. The entire interior was whitewashed, and in 1854 the walls and ceiling of the chancel were decorated with Neoclassical decorations. Plans for a thorough renovation were made in the 1920s but it was not until the 1960s that the church was restored and an archaeological survey conducted.

== Architecture ==
Vä Church was built around the same time as Lund Cathedral, which lies about 70 kilometres (43 mi) from Vä, and the similarities between the two buildings have been pointed out frequently. The monumental aspect, high quality of the craftsmanship of the builders, and several stylistic features connect Vä Church with the cathedral in Lund. Notably the apse and the decorative elements, influenced by contemporary Lombardic architecture, are clearly similar to corresponding elements in Lund Cathedral.

=== Exterior ===
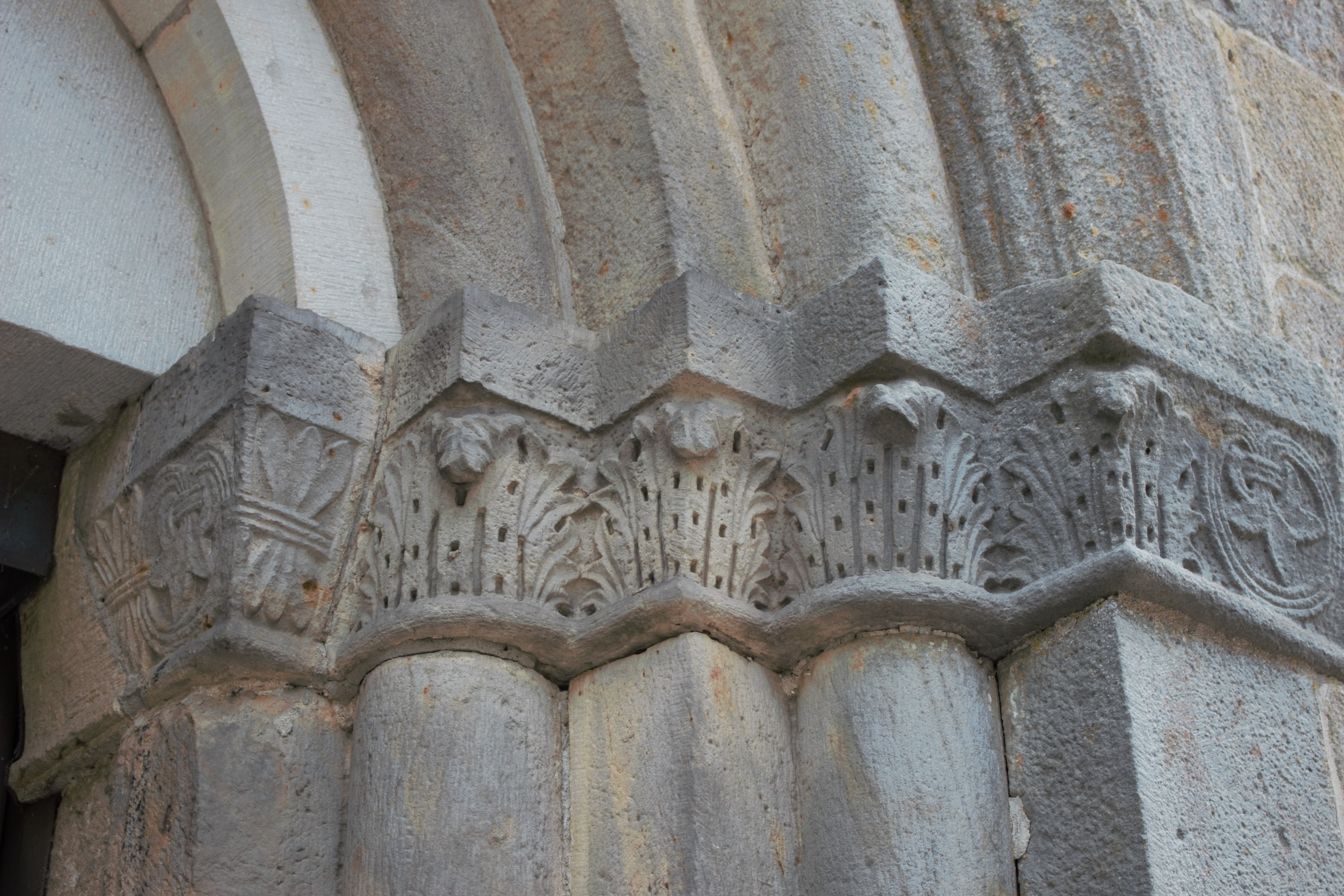
The southern capitals of the main entrance

The earliest parts of the building are easily distinguished from the later additions, which are whitewashed. In contrast, the original parts of the building are constructed of finely cut ashlars made of greyish sandstone. The building seen today consists of a nave which incorporates the base of the former western towers, a chancel and an apse. The only remaining, late medieval tower is joined with the nave approximately halfway along its south facade. The extension from 1593 is two bays wide and extends from the nave to the north. The total length of the church is 36 metres (118 ft).

The facade of the nave and chancel are decorated with lesenes at the corners, and corbel tables supporting the cornice at the height of the original walls; the top part of the nave walls are later and whitewashed. The apse is divided by four narrow columns, double corbel tables and a more marked cornice supporting the roof. Originally there were three portals leading into the church, of which the western one has been preserved relatively intact. The northern portal has vanished and the southern has been altered. It now connects the sacristy, located in the base of the tower, with the nave. The western portal still serves as the main entrance and is a round arched portal decorated with decorated capitals. The southern capitals are decorated with plant ornaments and the northern with figurative sculptures. The southern portal, now only visible from inside the sacristy, has an equally rich sculptural decoration. From the northern portal nothing remains except the decorated tympanum, found during the renovation of the church in the 1960s. Its decoration is almost identical to sculptures found in Lund Cathedral. Four original sculpted stones, depicting beasts and religious symbols, are also incorporated in the eastern part of the facade. In 1945, it was discovered that the weather vane on the roof was an aquamanile in the form of a knight on horseback, dating from the Romanesque era, i.e. the construction period of the church. It is one of only two such aquamaniles known in Sweden. The aquamanile was subsequently restored and exhibited in the church. A simplified copy was made to replace it as a weather vane.

=== Interior ===
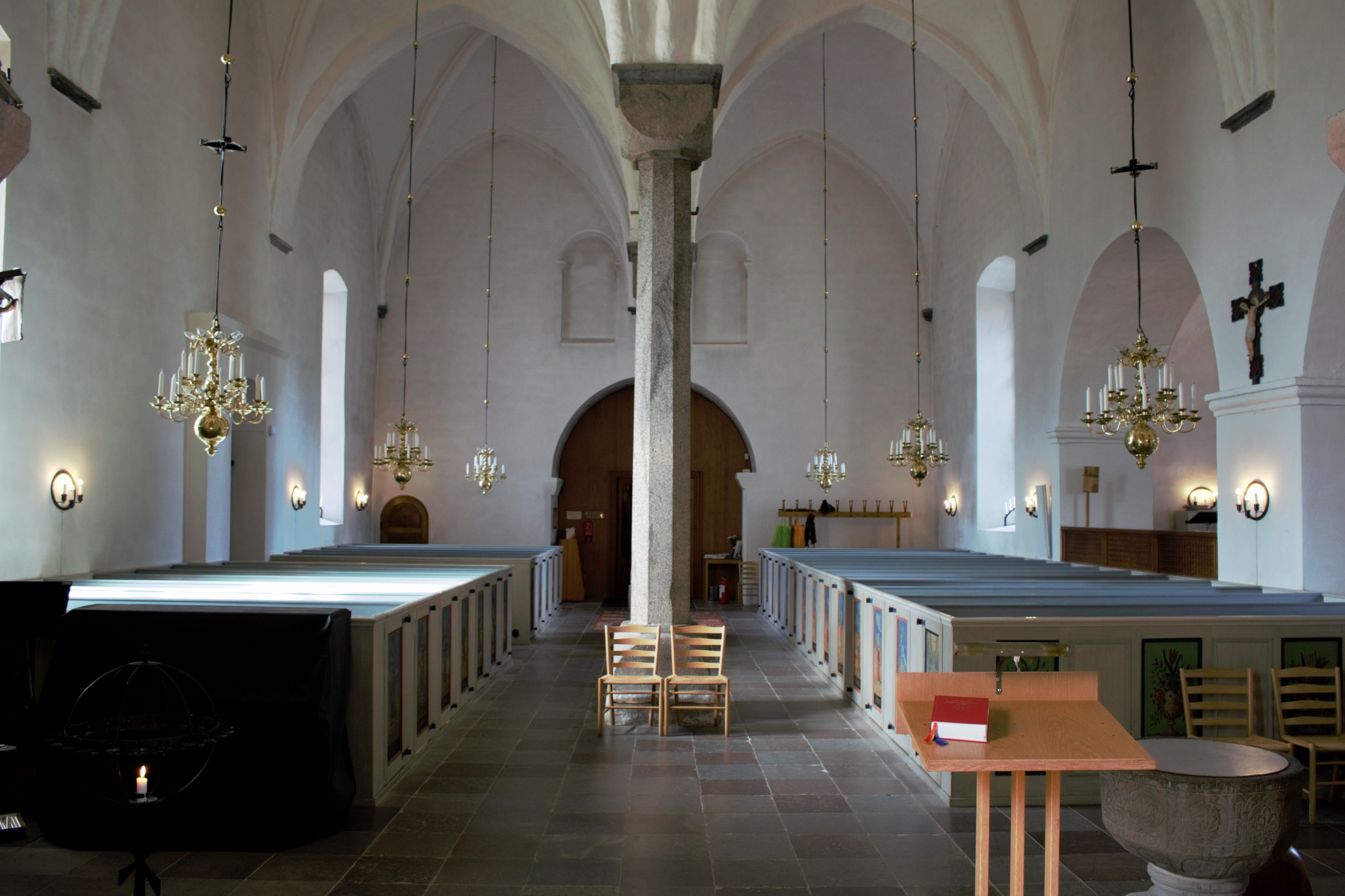
View of the nave from the chancel, towards the west

The best-preserved part of the interior is the eastern end, notably the chancel and the apse. The chancel is covered with an original barrel vault, and the apse by a semi-dome. There are four capitals preserved in each corner of the chancel. They may have been intended to carry a rib vault which was never built. The nave is dominated by the two central pillars carrying six rib vaults which were constructed in the 13th century. A large part of the north wall of the original nave has been demolished when the 1598 extension to the north was built, creating a shortened north transept. The nave is connected with the chancel through a wide, round arched chancel arch which is original. The west end of the church, the area surrounding the main entrance, originally also served as a base for the two towers which were demolished in the early 19th century. Above the main entrance there is a small room, which could have been a gallery once used by members of the royal family. From there they could participate in the celebration of mass without having to mingle with the congregation.

== Murals ==
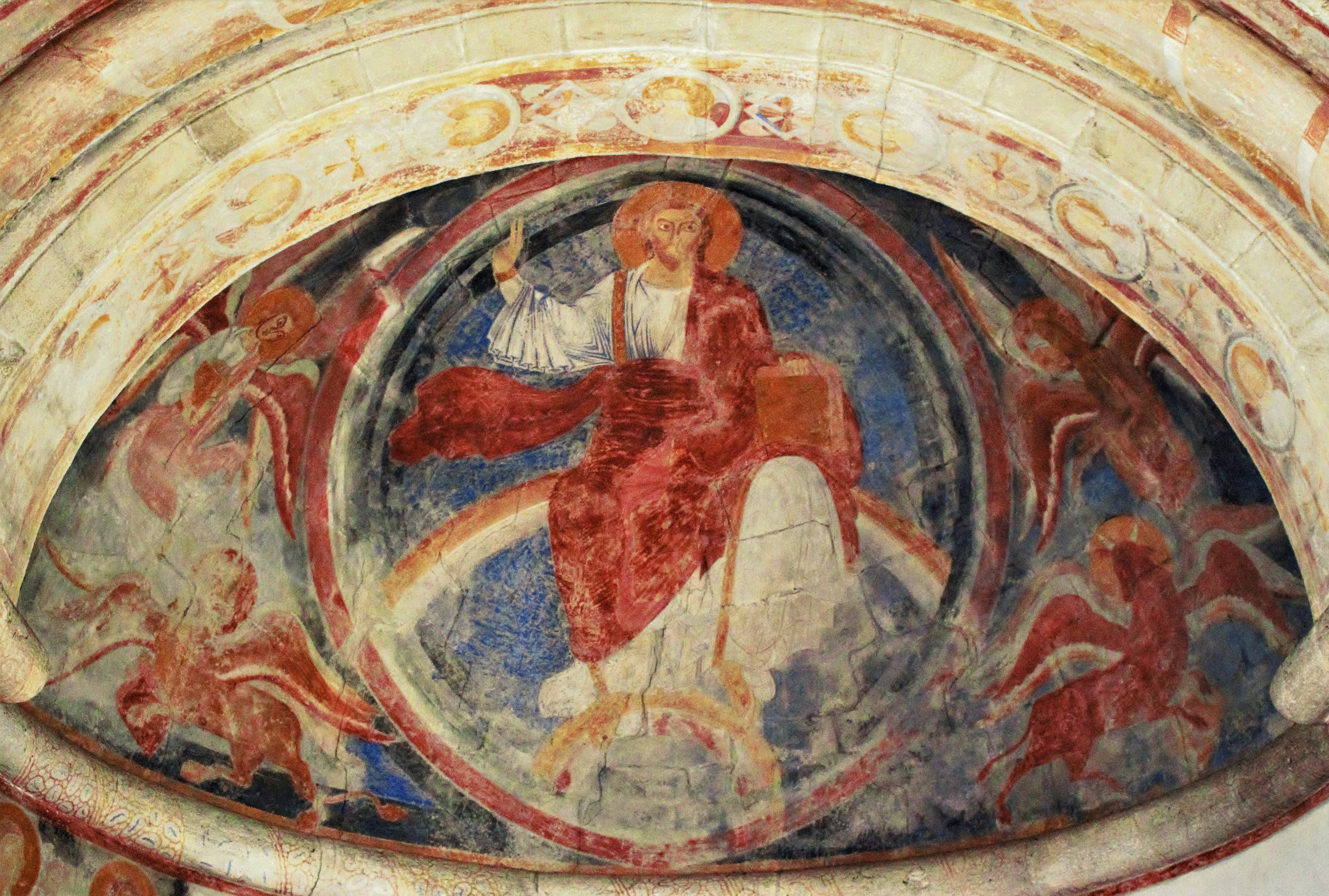
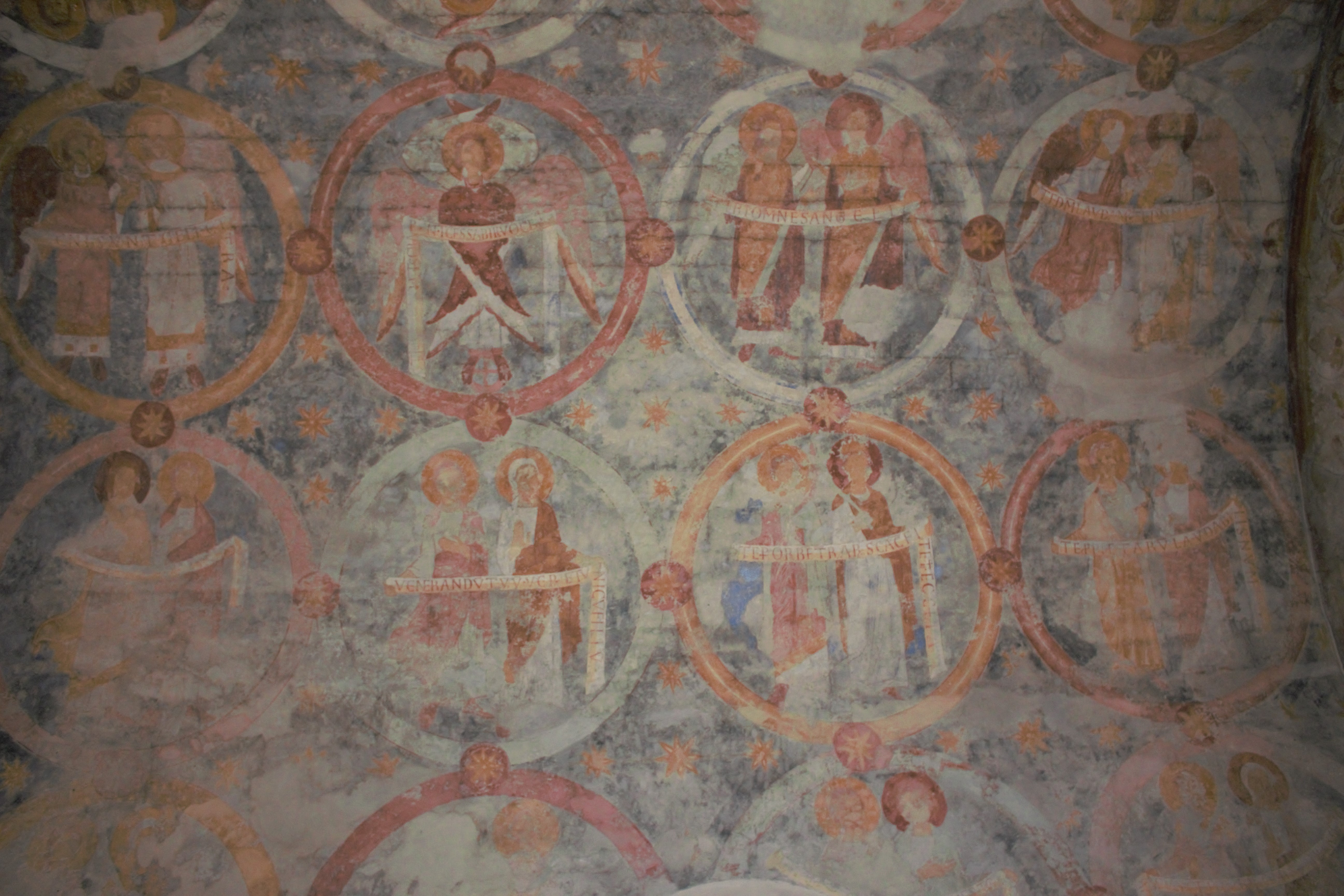
(left) The apse, Christ in Majesty surrounded by symbols of the Four Evangelists; (right) The chancel ceiling, angels and saints with the text of Te Deum.

Vä Church contains some of the oldest—possibly the very oldest—church murals in Sweden. They have been described as being "of excellent quality, also compared with the rest of Europe". Their style is Italo-Byzantine, in the same tradition as e.g. the murals in the Chapelle des moines de Berzé-la-Ville (France), St. Gabriel's Chapel in Canterbury Cathedral (England) or the Znojmo Rotunda (Czech Republic). In style they are closely related to those in Sigwardskirche in Wunstorf, Germany. These stylistic traits may have arrived from Eastern Europe, perhaps conveyed through the many personal contacts between the Danish royal family and the nobility of Kievan Rus'.

The murals decorate the entire chancel ceiling, the west wall of the chancel and the apse. The semi-dome of the apse shows Christ in Majesty, sitting on a rainbow with Earth as his footstool. The right hand of Christ is raised in a sign of blessing, and the left hand holds a book. He is dressed in an alb with blue details, decorated with clavi, golden bands originally denoting the majesty of the Roman emperor, but here signifying the Lord of Heaven. He is surrounded by the symbols of the Four Evangelists. This representation is typical for early Romanesque art in southern Sweden, but the painting is larger than usual, painted using unusually expensive pigments, and may indicate how the apse of Lund Cathedral could have been decorated originally. Beneath the semi-dome there are badly damaged murals depicting, on the north wall, what is probably an archangel and Saint Mary. On the wall between the apse and the chancel there are depictions of (possibly) two prophets.

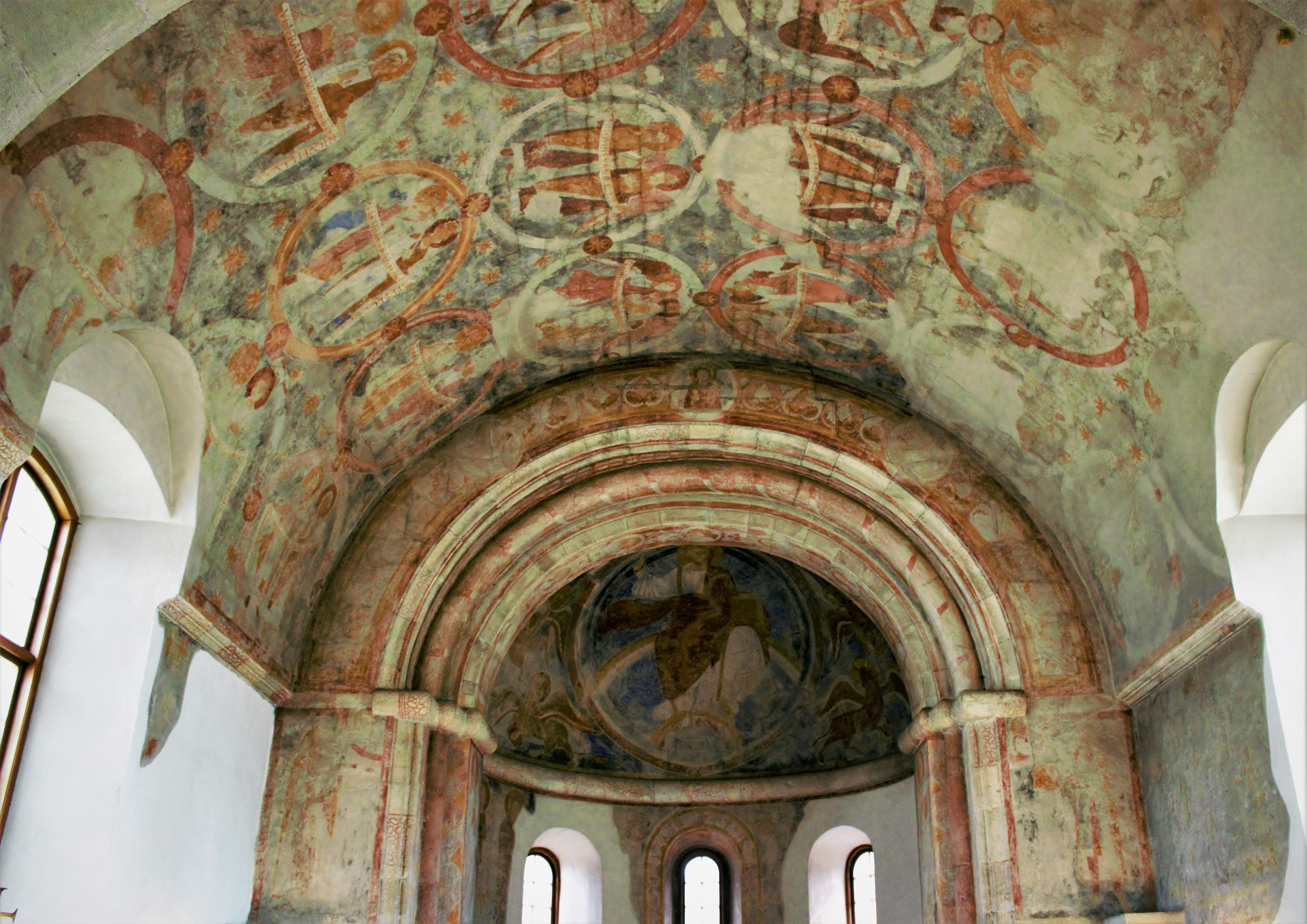
The barrel vaulted chancel and the murals

The barrel vault of the chancel is unique. A total of 24 round medallions contain images of angels, apostles and saints carrying speech scrolls with the text of the Christian hymn Te Deum. There are six rows with four medallions in each. The background is a representation of heaven, a blue sky with golden stars. The medallions are framed by concentric circles similar to the mandorla surrounding Christ in the apse, and the figures painted inside them have alternating rich or simple clothing. The pictorial programme of the chancel serves to emphasize liturgical elements from the Christian mass. On the wall of the chancel facing the apse there are the two donor portraits mentioned above, representing a king and a queen. Both are dressed in ornate Byzantine dress.

The paintings were once whitewashed. In 1854, the paintings in the apse were uncovered and an attempt to restore them was made. In 1963, work was begun to restore the murals. The three-year-long project was led by Våga Andersson-Lindell.

== Furnishings ==
The baptismal font of the church is a copy of the original, which was moved to the Swedish History Museum in Stockholm in 1867. The original font dates from sometime between 1175 and 1225 and is decorated with floral decorations and part of the text of the Hail Mary. On the north wall of the nave hangs a wooden cross, dated to c. 1400 on stylistic grounds. During the renovation of the building, a wooden altarpiece from 1674 was moved from the chancel to the north aisle. The central panel of the altarpiece contains a depiction of the Last Supper, while the upper part contains the coat of arms of both County Governor Magnus Durell and the coat of arms of Sweden. As Sweden had conquered the province from Denmark in 1658, the installation of the altarpiece can be seen as a political statement. The wooden pulpit dates from 1630. Its sides are decorated with sculptures depicting the Four Evangelists. The simple altar is the fourth altar of the church and was made in 1966, together with a golden cross designed by goldsmith Sven Arne Gillgren.

== Use and heritage status ==
Vä Church belongs to the Church of Sweden. It is one of two churches in Vä-Skepparslövs församling, a parish within the Diocese of Lund. The parish is part of Vä-Skepparslövs pastorat, a group of three parishes and a total of five churches in the local area. Services are regularly held in the church, and it is open to visitors daily during summer. It is a listed building.

== Bibliography ==
- Arbman, Holger (1947). "En medeltida ryttarakvamanil från Vä kyrka" [A medieval equestrian aquamanile from Vä Church] (PDF). Fornvännen. Journal of Swedish Antiquarian Research (in Swedish): 48–50.
- Banning, Knud (1984). Kalkmalerierne i Skånes, Hallands og Blekinges Kirker 1100-1600 [The lime paintings in the Churches of Skåne, Halland and Blekinge 1100-1600] (in Danish). Copenhagen: Gads Forlag. ISBN 87-12-05604-9.
- Dahlberg, Markus; Sjöström, Ingrid, eds. (2015). Skåne. Landskapets kyrkor [Scania. The churches of the province] (in Swedish). Stockholm: Riksantikvarieämbetet (Swedish National Heritage Board). ISBN 978-91-7209-710-0.
- Graebe, Henrik (1966). "En kunglig kyrka" [A royal church] (PDF). Ale. Historisk tidskrift för Skåneland (in Swedish) (1): 1–9.
- Graebe, Henrik (1967). "Kalkmålningarna i Vä kyrka" [The lime paintings in Vä Church] (PDF). Ale. Historisk tidskrift för Skåneland (in Swedish) (2): 1–14.
- Graebe, Henrik (1971). Kyrkorna i Vä [The churches in Vä] (PDF). Sveriges kyrkor, konsthistoriskt inventarium (in Swedish and English). Vol. 139. Stockholm: Almqvist & Wiksell. ISSN 0284-1894.
- Haastrup, Ulla (2015). "Stifterbilleder og deres ikonografi i danske 1100-tals fresker" [Donor pictures and their iconography in Danish frescos from the 12th century]. Iconographisk Post. (Nordic Review of Iconography) (in Danish) (4): 4–48. ISSN 2323-5586.
- Haastrup, Ulla; Lind, John H. (2016). "Dronning Margrete Fredkulla. Politisk magthaver og mæcen for byzantisk kunst i danske kirker i 1100-tallets begyndelse" [Queen Margaret Fredkulla. Politician and patron for Byzantine art in Danish churches at the early 12th century]. In Hermansson, Lars; Magnúsdóttir, Auður (eds.). Medeltidens genus. Kvinnors och mäns roller inom kultur, rätt och samhälle. Norden och Europa ca 300–1500 [Gender in the Middle Ages. The role of women and men within culture, justice and society. The Nordic countries and Europe circa 300–1500.] (in Danish). Gothenburg: Kriterium. pp. 29–71. doi:10.21524/kriterium.1. ISBN 978-91-7346-875-6.
- Haastrup, Ulla (2018). "Hertugparret malet i rotunden i Znojmo, 1134, Tjekkiet, er den bedste ikonografiske parallel til det danske kongelige stifterpar i Vä, 1121" [The donor couple painted in the Rotunda of St. Catherine in Znojmo (Czech Republic) in 1134 is the best iconographical parallel to the Danish royal donors in Vä Church, Sweden (1121).]. Iconographisk Post. (Nordic Review of Iconography) (in Danish) (4): 55–65. ISSN 2323-5586.
- Hansen, Kenth (2013). "Vem satt på läktaren? Fyra typer av emporer i skånska kyrkors romanska västtorn" [Who sat in the gallery? Four types of galleries in the Romanesque west towers of Scania’s churches.] (PDF). Fornvännen. Journal of Swedish Antiquarian Research (in Swedish). 108 (3): 178–195.
- Laust Krambs, Karsten (21 March 2019). "Vä kirkes årstal på pergamentet, revisited" [The date of Vä Church on the parchment, revisited]. Academia.edu (in Danish).
- Lindgren, Mereth (1995a). "Stenarkitekturen" [The stone architecture]. In Karlsson, Lennart (ed.). Signums svenska konsthistoria. Den romanska konsten [Signum's history of Swedish art. Romanesque art] (in Swedish). Lund: Signum. pp. 299–335. ISBN 91-87896-23-0.
- Lindgren, Mereth (1995b). "Kalkmålningarna" [The lime paintings]. In Karlsson, Lennart (ed.). Signums svenska konsthistoria. Den romanska konsten [Signum's history of Swedish art. Romanesque art] (in Swedish). Lund: Signum. pp. 299–335. ISBN 91-87896-23-0.
- Rydbeck, Monica (1965). "En relikdosa från Vä kyrka" [A reliquary from Vä Church] (PDF). Ale. Historisk tidskrift för Skåneland (in Swedish) (2): 24–30.
- Skyum-Nielsen, Niels (1951). "De aeldste privilegier for klostret i Vae. Et nyfund" [The oldest privileges for the monastery in Vä. A new discovery.]. Scandia: Tidskrift för Historisk Forskning (in Danish). 21 (1): 1–28.
- Wahlöö, Claes (2014). Skånes kyrkor 1050-1949 [The churches of Skåne 1050–1949] (in Swedish). Kävlinge: Domus Propria. ISBN 978-91-637-5874-4.
