= Church murals in Sweden =

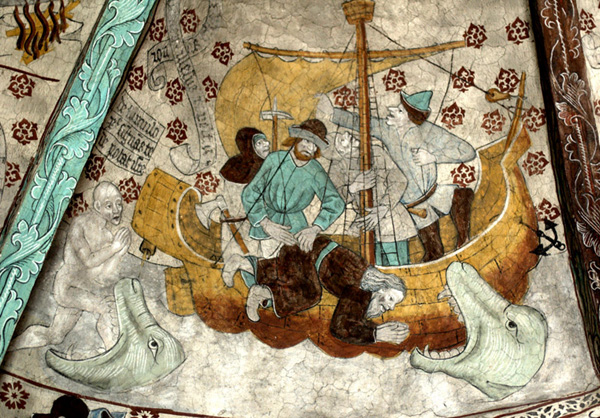
Jonah being thrown in the sea, late 15th-century mural by Albertus Pictor in Härkeberga Church. Most church murals in Sweden are from this time, and Albertus Pictor the most well-known artist of the time.

Church murals or church wall paintings are mostly medieval paintings found in several Swedish churches. They usually adorn the vaults or walls of the buildings. In Swedish they are sometimes referred to as kalkmålningar, literally "lime paintings", since they were often painted using lime as the binding medium for the paint. The earliest church murals in Sweden date from the first decades of the 12th century and are Romanesque in style. The majority of these are found in the southern part of Sweden, where they were commissioned by members of the royalty and nobility of the time. They all have certain iconographic similarities, and for the most part, show stylistic influences from contemporary art in what is now Germany. While it is assumed that the artists who painted the murals were well-educated, and the first of them foreigners, virtually nothing is known about their identities. Around 1250, there was a stylistic shift towards Gothic that saw lighter and more airy compositions and the rising popularity of Marian and Christian mystic motifs. Early and High Gothic murals are preserved, especially on the island of Gotland, where many new churches were built at the time, and in Scania, where many older churches were equipped with new vaults which were then decorated. The earliest known names of the artists date from this time.

Most of the murals date from the 15th and early 16th centuries, when many churches were built or rebuilt, in particular in the provinces around Lake Mälaren. These Late Gothic murals are more variegated than the earlier Gothic paintings, and decoration was more profuse. They tend to cover the entire wall surface. There is also a shift towards more narrative painting, with more frequent inclusion of didactic and moralising subjects. The iconography, on the whole, is more fragmented and the paintings are often completed with much less of an overarching principle. A number of artists and workshops from the late Middle Ages are known by name, above all Albertus Pictor. The workshops typically consisted of three people, including the master; painting work was performed only during the summer months. They used a variety of pigments, and the palette of the artists expanded as the Middle Ages progressed. After the Reformation, new church murals were occasionally still created, but during the late 17th century and in particular, during the 18th and early 19th centuries, most murals were covered with whitewash. Many of them have later been uncovered and restored, in particular in the 20th century. Today there are a large number of church murals in Sweden, compared to other European countries. The Swedish History Museum describes them as a "unique treasure".

== History ==
=== Romanesque murals ===
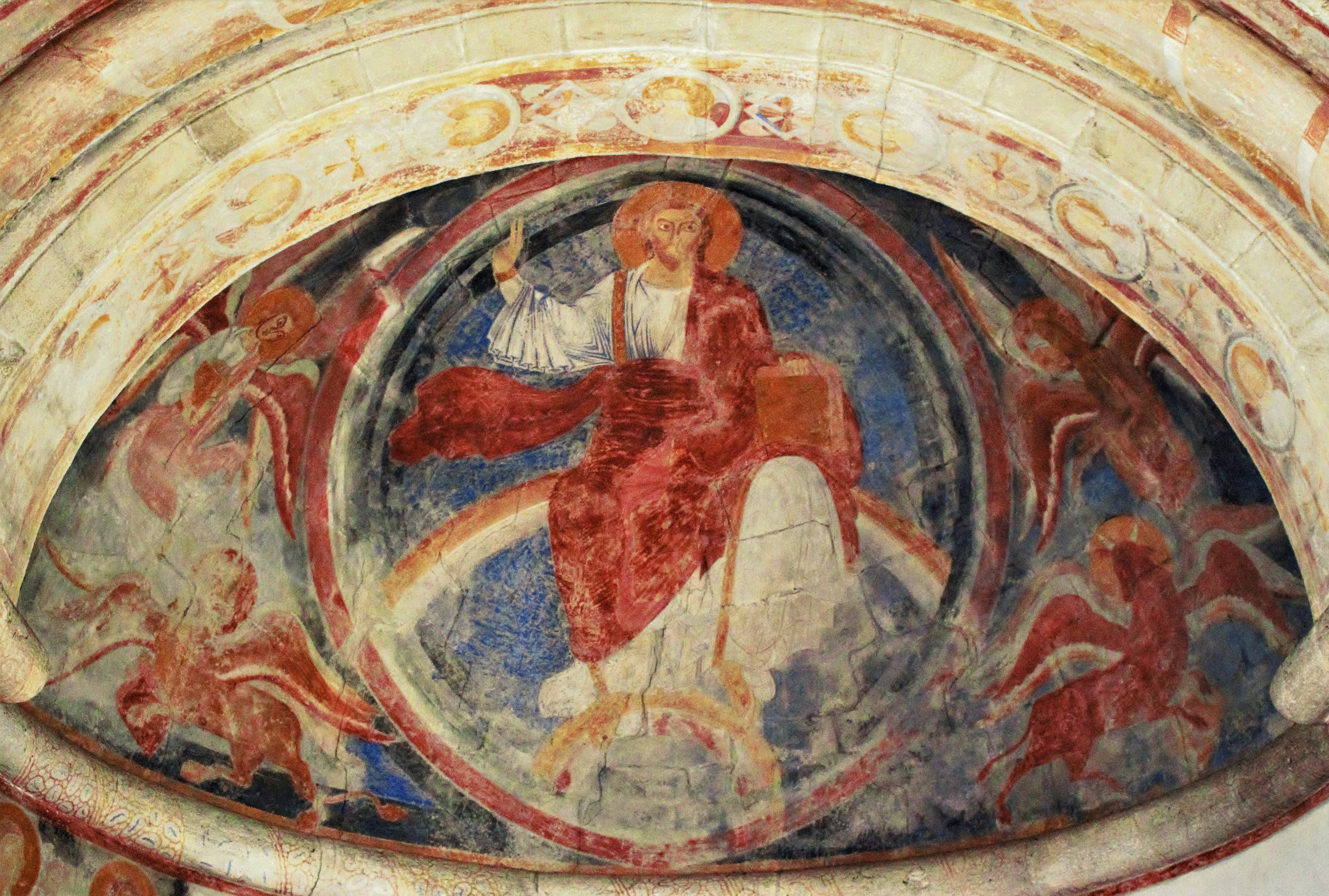
The Romanesque murals in Vä Church, possibly the oldest in Sweden, were probably created under royal patronage.

The oldest existing church murals in Sweden date from the first decades of the 12th century. They are in a Romanesque style, which was the dominant style until the middle of the 13th century. No set of Romanesque murals has been preserved intact; some have been altered or restored at later dates, while some have faded significantly. In many cases, only fragments remain. The largest number of surviving Romanesque murals are found in the southern provinces. Remains exist in about 50 churches in Scania, making it the principal province for surviving Romanesque church murals. Most other murals are spread out over the rest of Götaland. The only known Romanesque murals north of Lake Mälaren are in Romfartuna Church in Västmanland. The expenses connected with decorating a church with murals, and the prevalence of donor portraits in many of the preserved sets of paintings, has led to the assumption that the earliest murals were commissioned by members of the elite. The paintings in Vä Church contain donor portraits depicting a Danish king and queen, (Note: Scania was a part of Denmark until the Treaty of Roskilde in 1658.) probably King Niels and Queen Margaret Fredkulla, indicating that the church was commissioned by the royal couple. Similarly, Stehag Church contains a donor portrait of King Canute VI and an archbishop, while Gualöv Church contains donor portraits of a knight called Uticus and his wife Hialmswith. Romanesque murals in Swedish churches have been described as generally of high quality and comparable with contemporary European murals.

Romanesque murals in Sweden were always composed in a similar way. The apse of the church is without exception decorated with a depiction of Christ in Majesty surrounded by a mandorla. Well-preserved examples exist in Hästveda Church, Lackalänga Church and Övraby Church. Christ is flanked by the symbols of the Four Evangelists. Depictions of Cain and Abel were sometimes painted on the arch of the apse, and sometimes on the chancel arch (facing the nave), or on the underside of the chancel arch. The chancel arch could also contain images of saints or donor portraits, and sometimes a depiction of the Passion was painted above the arch. The south wall of the nave was sometimes decorated with scenes from the Old Testament, while the north wall was decorated with scenes from the New Testament.

The first murals were painted by foreign artists, but with time local artists also started to produce them. Those in Vä are probably the oldest (c. 1120–1130), and also some of the most extensive and well-preserved intact sets of Romanesque murals in Sweden. Their style is Italo-Byzantine, similar to other European murals from the first half of the 12th century, particularly those in Sigwardskirche near Hanover in north-western Germany. For the most part, for example in the well-preserved murals in Bjäresjö Church, stylistic influences came from Germany. In some cases, they may be discernible from France (Knislinge Church and Höör Church) as well as (possibly) Lombardy (Vinslöv Church). A few early murals in churches on Gotland are of a Russo-Byzantine style; of these the paintings in Garde Church (c. 1200) are the best preserved.

=== Early and High Gothic murals ===
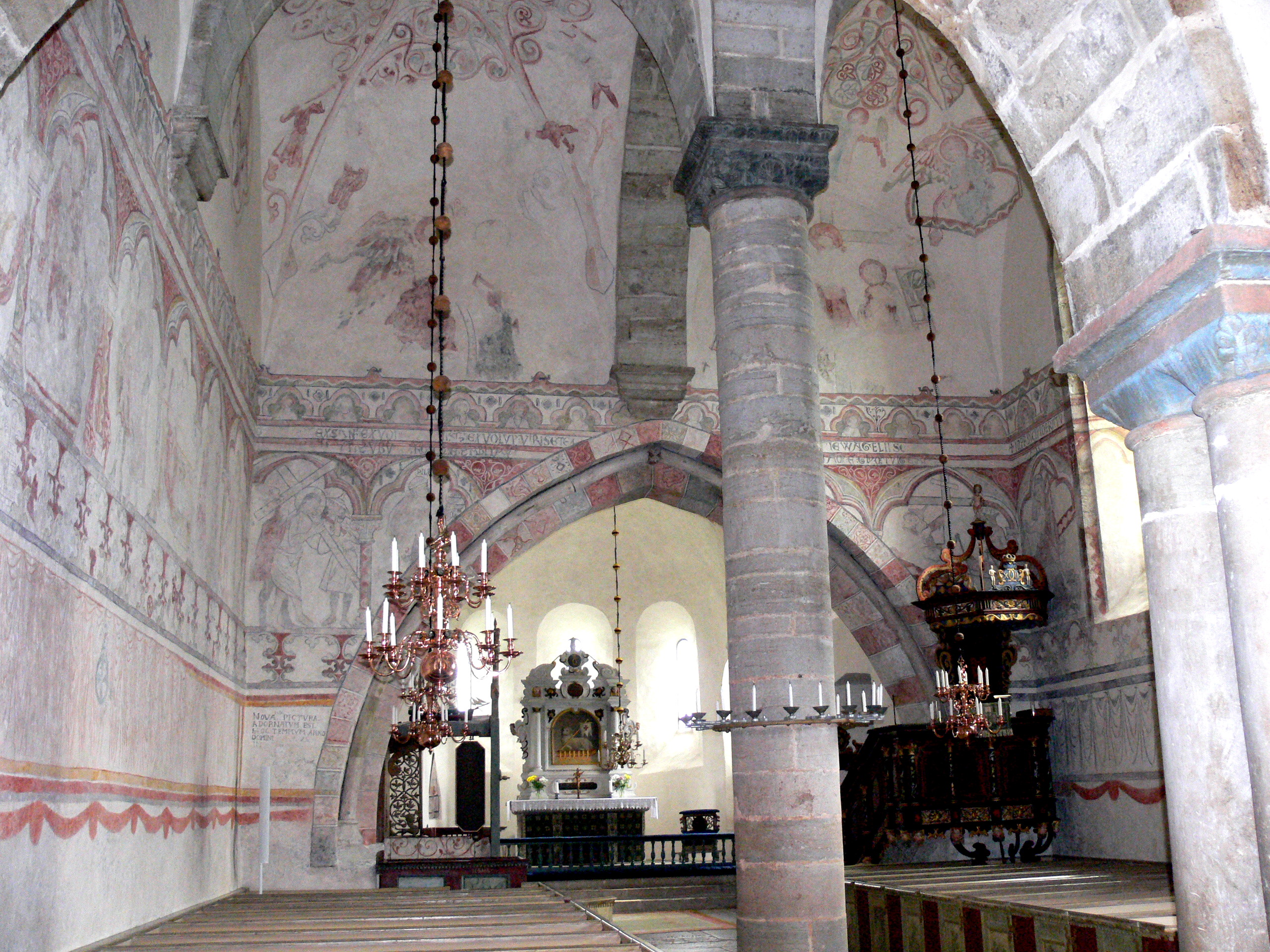
High Gothic murals dominating the interior of Gothem Church on Gotland

A stylistic change from what is generally known as Romanesque art to Gothic art took place c. 1250 in Sweden. The period between approximately 1250 and 1300 is sometimes referred to as Early Gothic while that from c. 1300 to 1380 as High Gothic. In broad terms, the iconography of the murals remained similar. Some changes did however occur in the choice of subject matter.

During the 13th century, as the veneration of Mary grew stronger, Marian themes became more popular subjects. For example, the Coronation of the Virgin became more frequent. During the 14th century, a greater interest in Christian mysticism can also be seen in the choice of subject matter (e.g. the Mass of Saint Gregory), paired with a shift in focus from representing Christ as triumphant to representations of his suffering during the Passion. Purely decorative paintings also appear during the period.

Stylistically, the Early and High Gothic period marks a shift towards a lighter scale of colours. The paintings no longer cover entire surfaces, as in the Romaneqsue period, but instead stand out against the white background of the walls. New opportunities for decorations were provided when wooden church ceilings and barrel vaults began to be replaced by groin vaults made of bricks or stone. The earliest of these are purely decorative, with no figurative representations. The stylistic influences came, by and large, from Westphalia and Saxony, often transmitted via Lübeck. A large number of both Early and High Gothic church murals can be found in the churches on Gotland, which experienced a period of economic growth in c. 1250–1350, and in Scania, where many older churches were rebuilt and equipped with brick vaults in the 14th century. In many murals on Gotland, e.g. those in Vamlingbo Church, a particularly strong influence from Westphalian contemporary art, Byzantinesque in style, has been noted. Although both Early and High Gothic murals in Scania remained conservative and stylistically close to Romanesque art, some new subjects, such as the Wheel of Fortune, were introduced. Humans are represented as elongated and swaying, with gently flowing folds in their dress, in contrast to the earlier, more hieratic Romanesque figures. The style of High Gothic murals is generally similar to Early Gothic, but coarser and heavier in execution, as exemplified by the murals in Gothem Church on Gotland.

=== Late Gothic murals ===
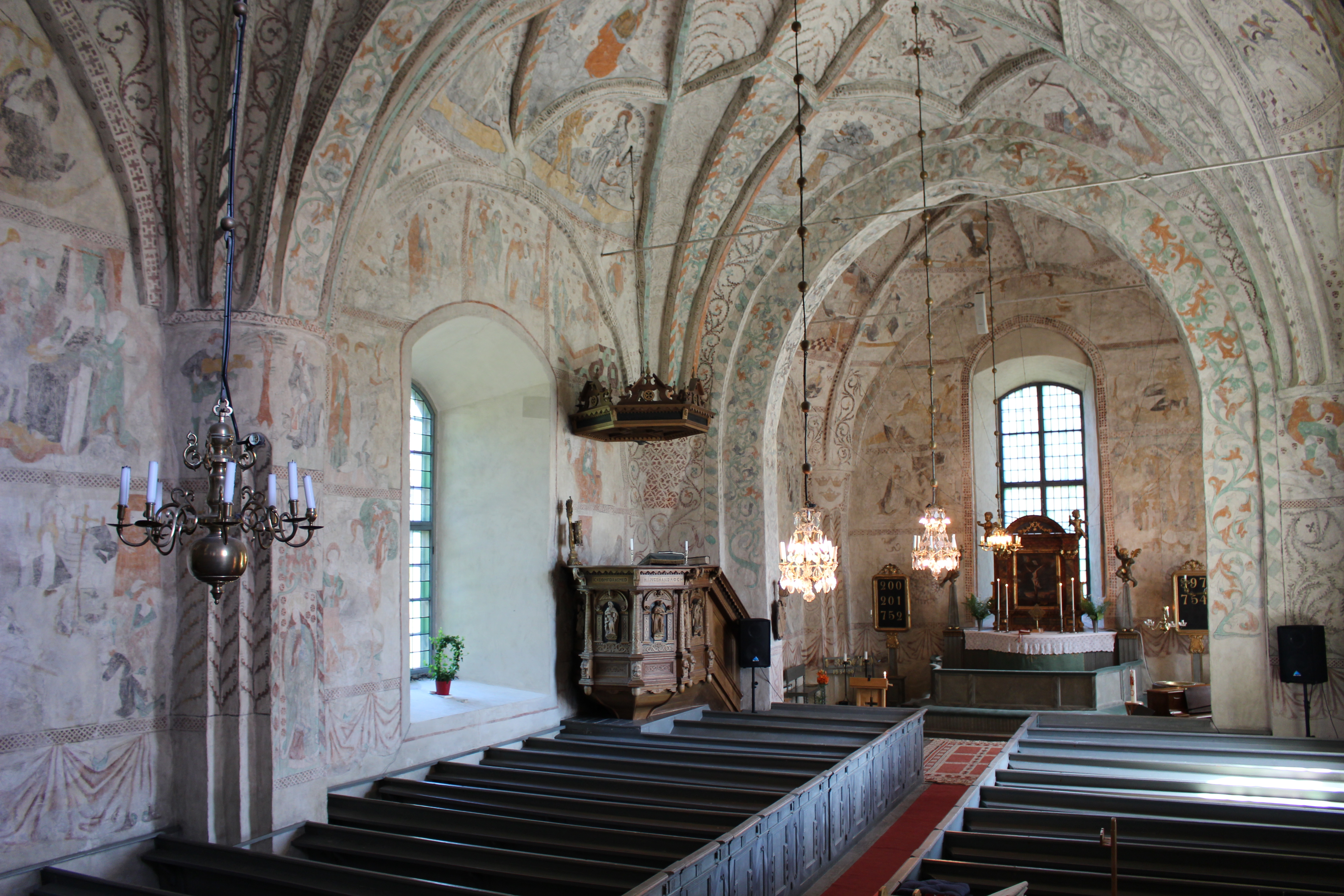
The interior of Rasbokil Church. Like many other churches in the region around Lake Mälaren, the entire church interior was decorated with murals during the late Middle Ages; these date from c. 1520. After being whitewashed over, they were uncovered in the 20th century.

The vast majority, perhaps as many as 75 percent, of the medieval church murals in Sweden date from the 15th and early 16th centuries. Some of the earliest examples of this Late Gothic style can be found in the chapter house of Vadstena Abbey. These murals were probably painted during the later decades of the 14th century and display both stylistic and iconographic influences from northern Germany, particularly from the painter Master Bertram. It is however mainly the area around Lake Mälaren, particularly Uppland and Västmanland, which sees a dramatic increase in production of church murals between c. 1435 and 1500. Economic development allowed new churches to be built and old ones refurbished; almost all the churches in the region were equipped with brick vaults which were then decorated. Archbishop Jakob Ulvsson (1430s–1521) also encouraged development and his coat of arms is painted in several of the churches. The rate at which churches in the vicinity of Stockholm during the 15th century were decorated with paintings has been described as "epidemic". A substantial number of murals dating from this time can also be found in Väster- and Östergötland, as well as in Scania. Late Gothic murals which are similar to those from the Mälaren region can also be found in Dalarna, Norrland, and also in Finland. (Note: Finland was a part of Sweden until the Treaty of Fredrikshamn in 1809.) The northernmost church with Late Gothic murals is Nederluleå Church in Norrbotten.

During this period, Marian themes became more popular than ever, and also more varied (including representations of the Woman of the Apocalypse and the Hunt for the Unicorn). There was an increase in paintings of saints and their legends. The pictorial programme of the church became more fragmented, and subjects and motifs were more often mixed without a strong overarching principle. Still, some general tendencies can be observed, at least in the churches in Uppland. The choir would often contain scenes from the life of Christ, or Marian subjects. The nave was often decorated with illustrations from the Old Testament, and the often spacious church porches usually contained more profane subjects. Didactic art became more prevalent, as well as moralising subjects – including many depictions of devils in mural art.

On the whole, Late Gothic paintings are more narrative and less decorative than earlier Gothic murals. Humans are depicted more linearly, with sharper contours and more solid volumes, and the ornamentation is more varied, detailed and richer. The entire church, including both the walls and the vaults, was typically decorated. The palette of colours is extended and there is a tendency towards exuberance or gaudiness. Woodcuts and Paupers' Bibles were used as examples by the artists (though pure copies were rare). During this time, influences from Early Netherlandish painting, including attempts at realism and perspective, can be seen in a few of the murals; again probably via German transposition (some of the artists such as Albertus Pictor and Johannes Rosenrod were themselves German). On the whole, however, church murals continued to follow a vernacular, decorative style with few elements emerging from the nascent Renaissance in the rest of Europe.

=== Later decorations, maltreatment and restorations ===
In contrast to some other countries, the Reformation in Sweden during the 16th century was not accompanied by any widespread iconoclasm. Most church murals remained unspoiled, and were occasionally even restored, after the Reformation. The lack of any major wars on Swedish soil since the Middle Ages further contributed to preserving many of the murals. Some completely new church murals were also created during the 17th and 18th centuries, often conservative, almost medieval, in style. Towards the end of the 17th century, however, church murals began to be covered with whitewash in several churches. It has been suggested that a growing emphasis on Protestant Orthodoxy within the Church of Sweden led to a less tolerant attitude towards the murals. In the late 18th and early 19th centuries, a more systematic covering of murals took place, on stylistic rather than theological grounds: the Neoclassical ideals of the time valued un-decorated, white church interiors more highly valued than the historical murals. Only a fragmentary number of church murals in Sweden have survived untouched until today; most of them were at some point covered with whitewash. From the late 19th century, and in particular during the 20th century, murals were uncovered and restored. Sometimes these "restorations" in turn led to further deterioration or even destruction. In general, however, there are still an unusually large number of murals in Sweden, compared to those elsewhere in Europe. The Swedish History Museum describes them as a "unique treasure".

== Technique ==
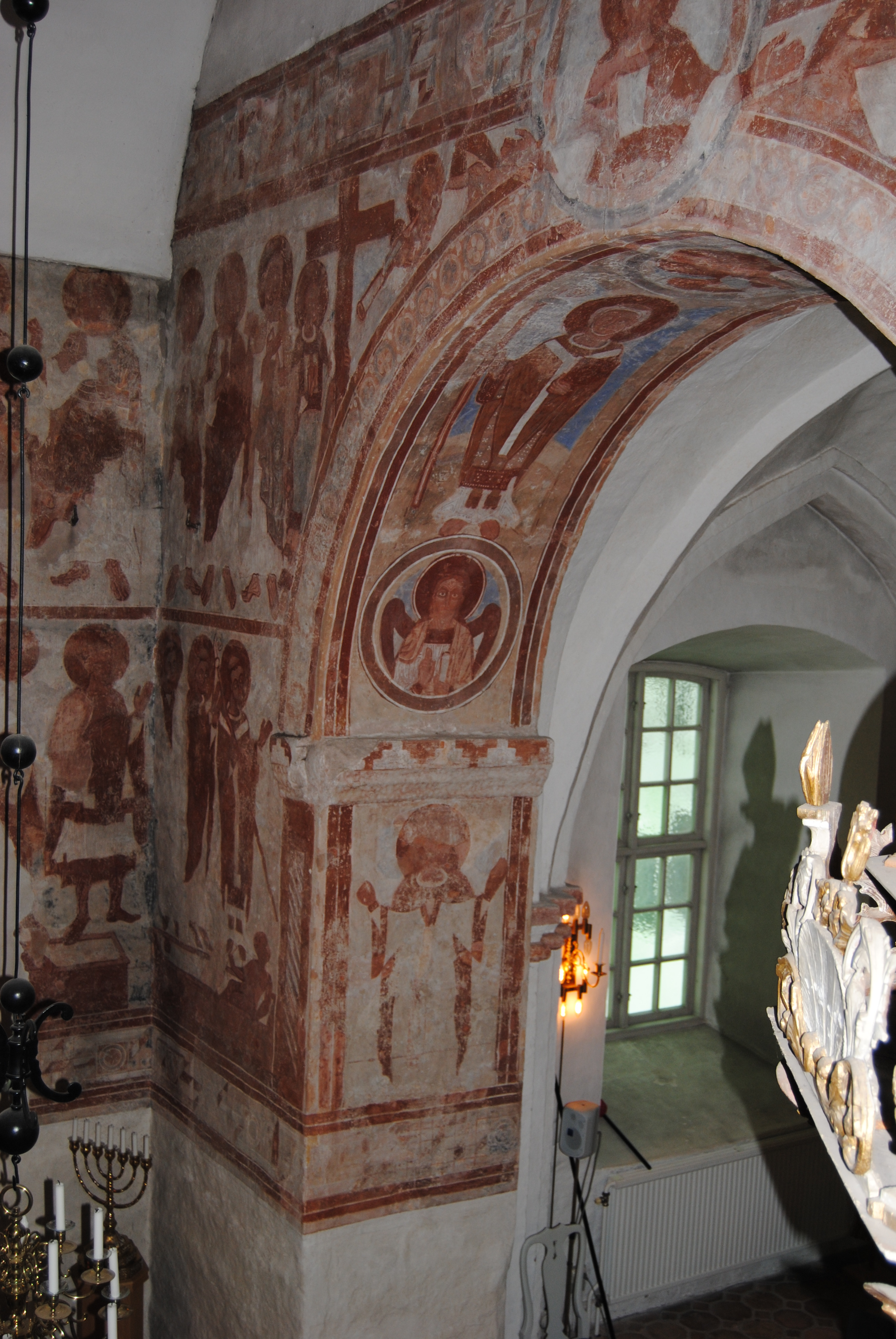
Restored Romanesque murals at Finja Church, now dominated by reddish-brown hues due to colour changes over time.

During the Middle Ages paintings were made on both wood and stone, but most are found in stone churches. The oldest church murals, from the Romanesque period, were painted using a combination of affresco and a secco techniques. The bare wall was first covered with a thick layer of coarse plaster which was then covered with whitewash and pierced, as a foundation for a fine layer of smooth plaster. While still moist, contours were painted on this layer using red ochre. Colours based on earth pigments, carbon black and white lead were also applied affresco. Some colours were however based on pigments which were ruined if applied on a wet surface. They were therefore applied in a second stage on the dry wall, or a secco. They included shades of green (pigments based on copper or malachite), ultramarine (pigments made from lapis lazuli, seldom used in Swedish church murals), and red (pigments based on cinnabar). Other pigments found in church murals from the 12th and 13th centuries are green earth, atacamite, minium, massicot and azurite, though common and simple pigments dominate. Decorating a Romanesque church with murals was nonetheless a costly undertaking due to the expensive materials used as pigments. In addition, Romanesque murals were sometimes augmented by lightly sculpted elements: halos of saints could be sculpted in stucco and gilded, or decorated with small balls of white paint intended to mimic pearls. Sometimes gilded copper plates were attached to highlight certain elements. In some cases, murals were decorated with rock crystals. Throughout the Middle Ages, lime was used as binding medium for the paint, but occasionally casein, erucic acid and drying oils were used.

From c. 1200, there were changes in technique. Instead of working on a smooth layer of plaster, the painters now painted directly on a rougher, more uneven layer of plaster. Some elements were still painted affresco but a secco dominated. Contours were carved into the wet surface instead of painted, as before. Towards the end of the Middle Ages, the technique changed again: now the contours were typically drawn using charcoal or sometimes a pigment based on iron oxide. After the outlines had been made, the paints were applied, and lastly text (in the form of speech scrolls) and stenciled details and patterns were added. The palette of pigments expanded and changed as the Middle Ages progressed. Albertus Pictor, working at the end of the 15th and early 16th century, for example, used lead-tin-yellow, orpiment and Naples yellow in addition to pigments already mentioned. His workshop furthermore imported several pigments, probably from Germany. Albertus Pictor also used glazes on some details.

Many of these colours have faded or changed over time. Some light, lead-based pigments tend to oxidize into darker plattnerite when painted, as was the rule, on lime background (but not when painted on wood). Similarly, cinnabar red has occasionally turned into metacinnabar. In addition, organic pigments such as brazilin have faded because of exposure to sunlight. In the Romanesque murals, the pigments used in painting a secco – typically details, such as eyes, and the most vibrant colours – have not been absorbed so well by the underlying material, and thus have a tendency to come off more easily, leaving only the affresco layer of the mural visible. This is particularly true in cases where the paintings were covered with whitewash at a later date. If and when the whitewash is removed, the a secco layer often also falls off.

== Artists ==
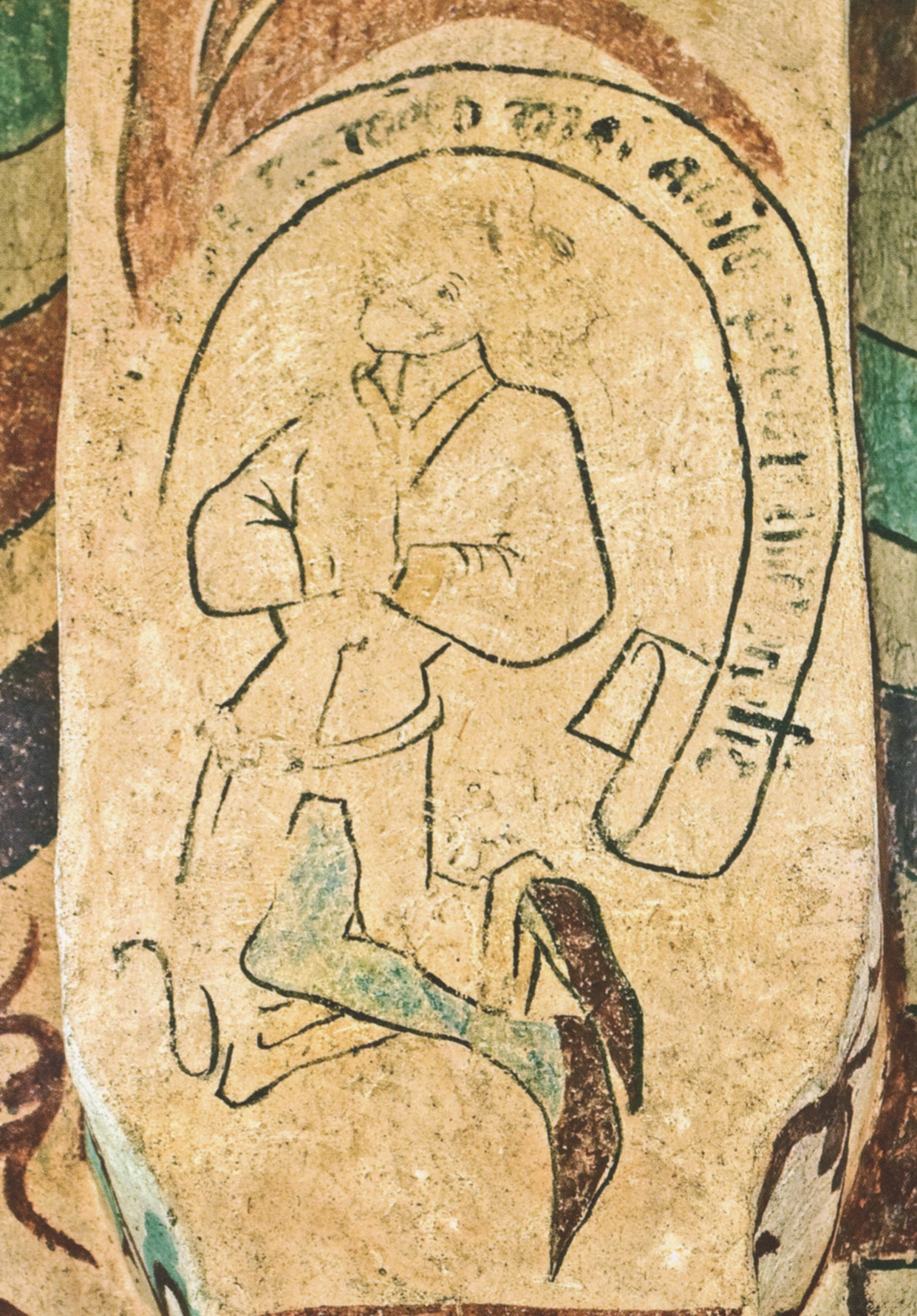
Self-portrait by Albertus Pictor in Lid Church

The technical execution as well as the iconography indicate that the artists who made the Romanesque murals were well educated. Overall, however, very little is known about the artists and workshops who made the earliest murals in Swedish churches. A few murals from the 13th century are signed, two in runes (Dädesjö Old Church, by Sigmund, and Anga Church, by Halvard) and one in majuscule (Veta Church by Magnus). More detailed records about artists and workshops exist in some cases from the mid-15th century. The names of several of these artists have been preserved, either by signatures and inscriptions in the churches, or in city archives such as those in Stockholm and Arboga. Albertus Pictor is the best known of these Late Gothic artists, already acquiring recognition and a following in his lifetime. His signature is known from six churches, while Lid Church also contains his self-portrait. His name is also mentioned in the city archives of Stockholm. In other cases, where no written sources exist, art historians have assigned notnames to groups of works either assumed to have been made by the same workshop or more loosely to works showing certain stylistic similarities with each other.

The artists who were active during the late Middle Ages typically belonged to workshops consisting of a master and one or two journeymen and/or apprentices. They often operated from a city and decorated the churches in the vicinity. Apart from murals, their work probably also encompassed the painting of altarpieces, textiles and other religious objects. Many of the artists seem to have performed other kinds of artistic work; some are noted in the archives as glaziers and carpenters, in addition to painters.

The murals were painted during the warmer months of the year, typically from early April to mid-August. If work could not be completed during the summer months, it was resumed the following spring.

== See also ==
- List of church murals in Sweden
- Church frescos in Denmark

== Works cited ==
- Anund, Johan; Qviström, Linda (2012). Det medeltida Uppland: en arkeologisk guidebok [Medieval Uppland: an acrhaeological guide book] (in Swedish). Lund: Historiska Media. ISBN 978-91-85873-74-6.
- Bengtsson Melin, Pia (2013). "Nyframtagna romanska målningar i Marka kyrka i Västegötland" [Recently uncovered Romanesque murals in Marka church, Västergötland] (PDF). Fornvännen. Journal of Swedish Antiquarian Research (in Swedish). 108 (4): 249–256. ISSN 0015-7813.
- Cornell, Henrik; Wallin, Sigurd (1917). Sengotiskt monumentalmåleri i Sverige [Late Gothic monumental painting in Sweden] (in Swedish). Uppsala.
- Cutler, Anthony (1969). "Garda, Källunge, and the Byzantine Tradition on Gotland". The Art Bulletin. 51 (3): 257–266. doi:10.2307/3048630. JSTOR 3048630.
- Lagerlöf, Erland (1972). Garde kyrka (PDF). Sveriges kyrkor, konsthistoriskt inventarium (in Swedish). Vol. 145. Stockholm: Almqvist & Wiksell. pp. 218–251. ISSN 0284-1894.
- Lindgren, Mereth (1995). "Kalkmålningarna" [The lime paintings]. In Karlsson, Lennart (ed.). Signums svenska konsthistoria. Den romanska konsten [Signum's history of Swedish art. Romanesque art] (in Swedish). Lund: Signum. pp. 299–335. ISBN 91-87896-23-0.
- Lindgren, Mereth (1996). "Kalkmålningarna" [The lime paintings]. In Augustsson, Jan-Erik (ed.). Signums svenska konsthistoria. Den gotiska konsten [Signum's history of Swedish art. Gothic art] (in Swedish). Lund: Signum. pp. 309–413. ISBN 91-87896-25-7.
- Lindgren, Mereth (1971). "Ett nytt tolkningsförsök av de romanska kalkmålningar i Vinslöv" [A new attempt at an interpretation of the Romanesque paintings in Vinslöv] (PDF). Fornvännen. Journal of Swedish Antiquarian Research (in Swedish): 113–117. ISSN 0015-7813.
- Nilsson, Ing-Marie (2015). "Det medeltida kyrkorummets utsmyckning och utrustning" [The decoration and furnishing of the medieval church]. In Dahlberg, Markus; Sjöström, Ingrid (eds.). Skåne. Landskapets kyrkor [Scania. The churches of the province] (in Swedish). Stockholm: Riksantikvarieämbetet (Swedish National Heritage Board). pp. 138–144. ISBN 978-91-7209-710-0.
- Nord, Anders G.; Tronner, Kate; Asp, Mia; Lundmark, Elin (2018). "Albertus Pictor: a Medieval master painter and his pigments" (PDF). Fornvännen. Journal of Swedish Antiquarian Research. 113 (2): 89–102. ISSN 0015-7813.
- Nord, Anders G.; Tronner, Kate (2010). Medeltidsmästarnas färgval: ett forskingsprojekt finansierat av Kungl. Vitterhets-, Historie- och Antikvitetsakademien [Colour choices of the medieval masters: a research project financed by the Royal Swedish Academy of Letters, History and Antiquities] (PDF) (in Swedish). Visby: Riksantikvarieämbetet (Swedish National Heritage Board).
- Nord, Anders G.; Tronner, Kate (2011). "Kemisk analys av fjorton medeltidskyrkors muralmålningar" [Chemical analyses of the murals in fourteen Medieval churches] (PDF). Fornvännen. Journal of Swedish Antiquarian Research (in Swedish). 106 (4): 334–341. ISSN 0015-7813.
- Söderberg, Bengt G. (1951). Svenska kyrkomålningar från medeltiden [Swedish church paintings from the Middle Ages] (in Swedish). Stockholm: Natur och kultur.
- Yrild Ahlstedt, Inger (1971). "En romansk inskrift i Gualövs kyrka" [A Romanesque inscription in Gualöv Church] (PDF). Fornvännen. Journal of Swedish Antiquarian Research (in Swedish): 214–220. ISSN 0015-7813.
