= Spravedlnost =

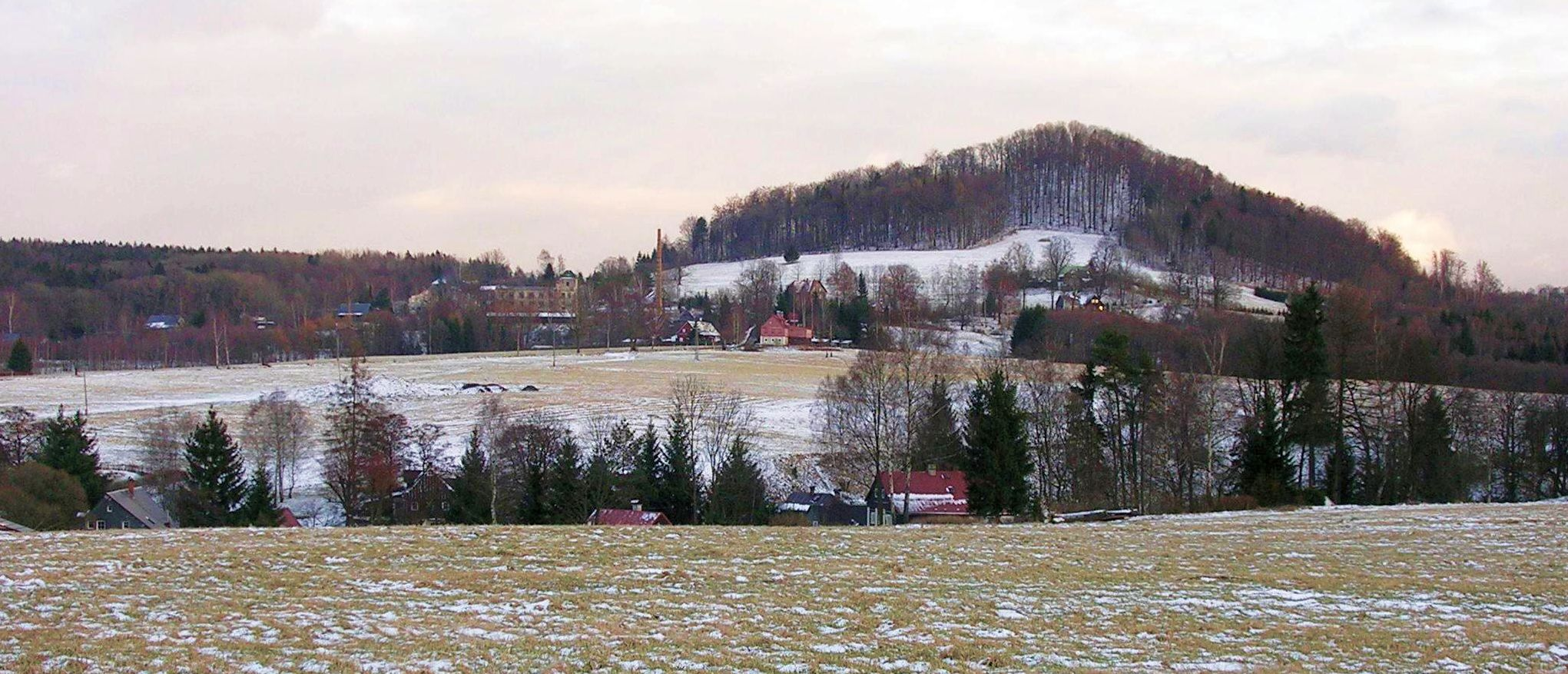
- Nová Doubice with the Spravedlnost

Highest point
- Elevation: 533 m (1,749 ft)
- Coordinates: 50°52′47″N 14°28′06″E

Geography
- Location within Czech Republic
- Location: Czech Republic
- Parent range: Bohemian Switzerland

Geology
- Mountain type: basalt

Spravedlnost, (German: Iricht, more rarely Irigt) is a hill, shrouded in legend, in the extreme east of Bohemian Switzerland. The 533 m (1,749 ft) high volcanic cone is the local mountain of the village of Doubice (German: Daubitz).

The basalt peak rises south of the village of Nová Doubice (Neudaubitz) on the old road to Chřibská (Kreibitz). On the southern slopes of the hill lie the houses of Liščí Bělidlo (Irichtbleiche) that belong to the municipality of Chřibská.
