= Donor portrait =

Portrait in a larger work showing the person who commissioned and paid for the image

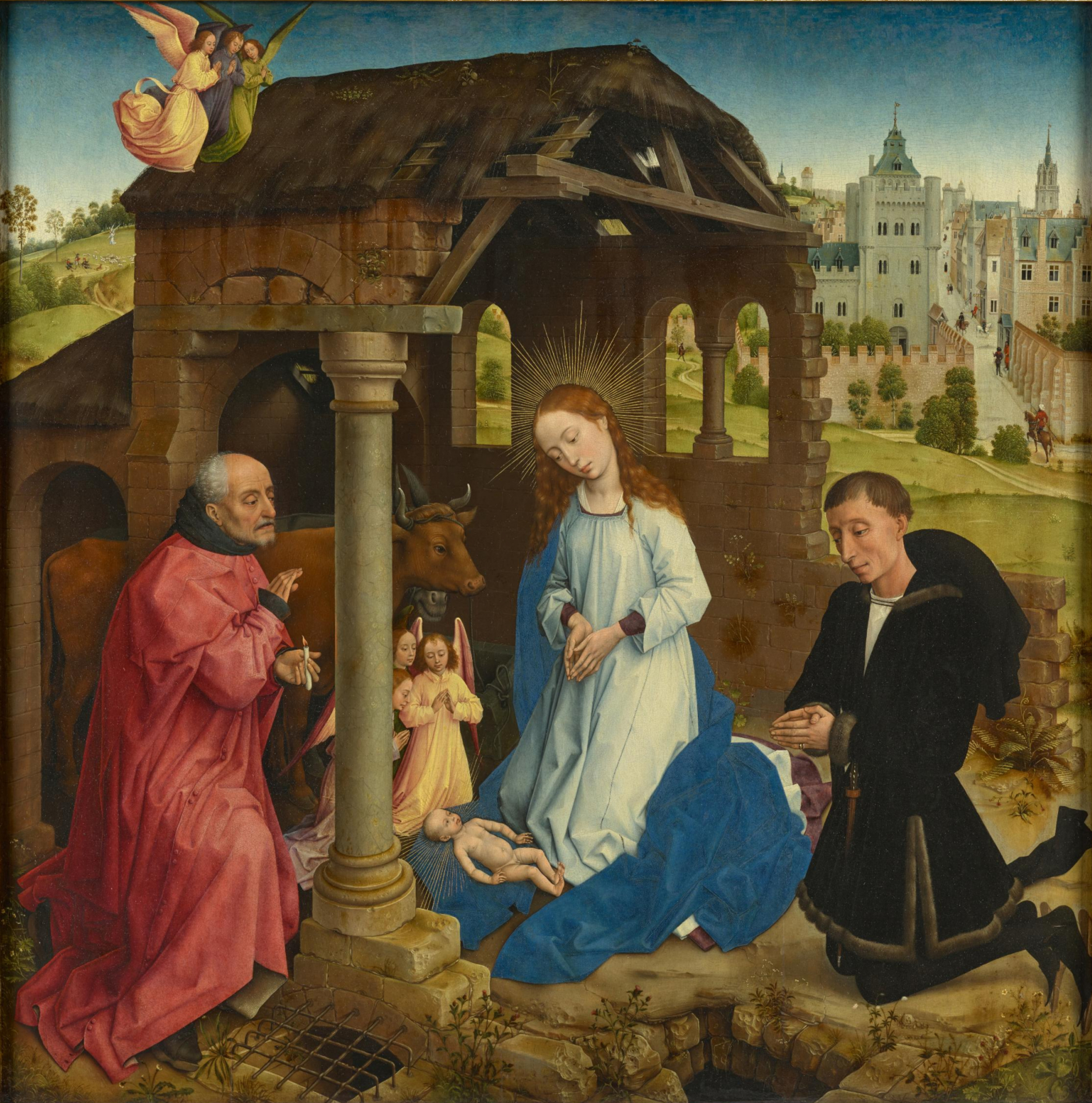
This 15th-century Nativity by Rogier van der Weyden shows the fashionably dressed donor integrated into the main scene, the central panel of a triptych.

A donor portrait or votive portrait is a portrait in a larger painting or other work showing the person who commissioned and paid for the image, or a member of his, or (much more rarely) her, family. Donor portrait usually refers to the portrait or portraits of donors alone, as a section of a larger work, whereas votive portrait may often refer to a whole work of art intended as an ex-voto, including for example a Madonna, especially if the donor is very prominent. The terms are not used very consistently by art historians, as Angela Marisol Roberts points out, and may also be used for smaller religious subjects that were probably made to be retained by the commissioner rather than donated to a church.

Donor portraits are very common in religious works of art, especially paintings, of the Middle Ages and Renaissance, the donor usually shown kneeling to one side, in the foreground of the image. Often, even late into the Renaissance, the donor portraits, especially when of a whole family, will be at a much smaller scale than the principal figures, in defiance of linear perspective. By the mid-15th century donors began to be shown integrated into the main scene, as bystanders and even participants.

== Placement ==
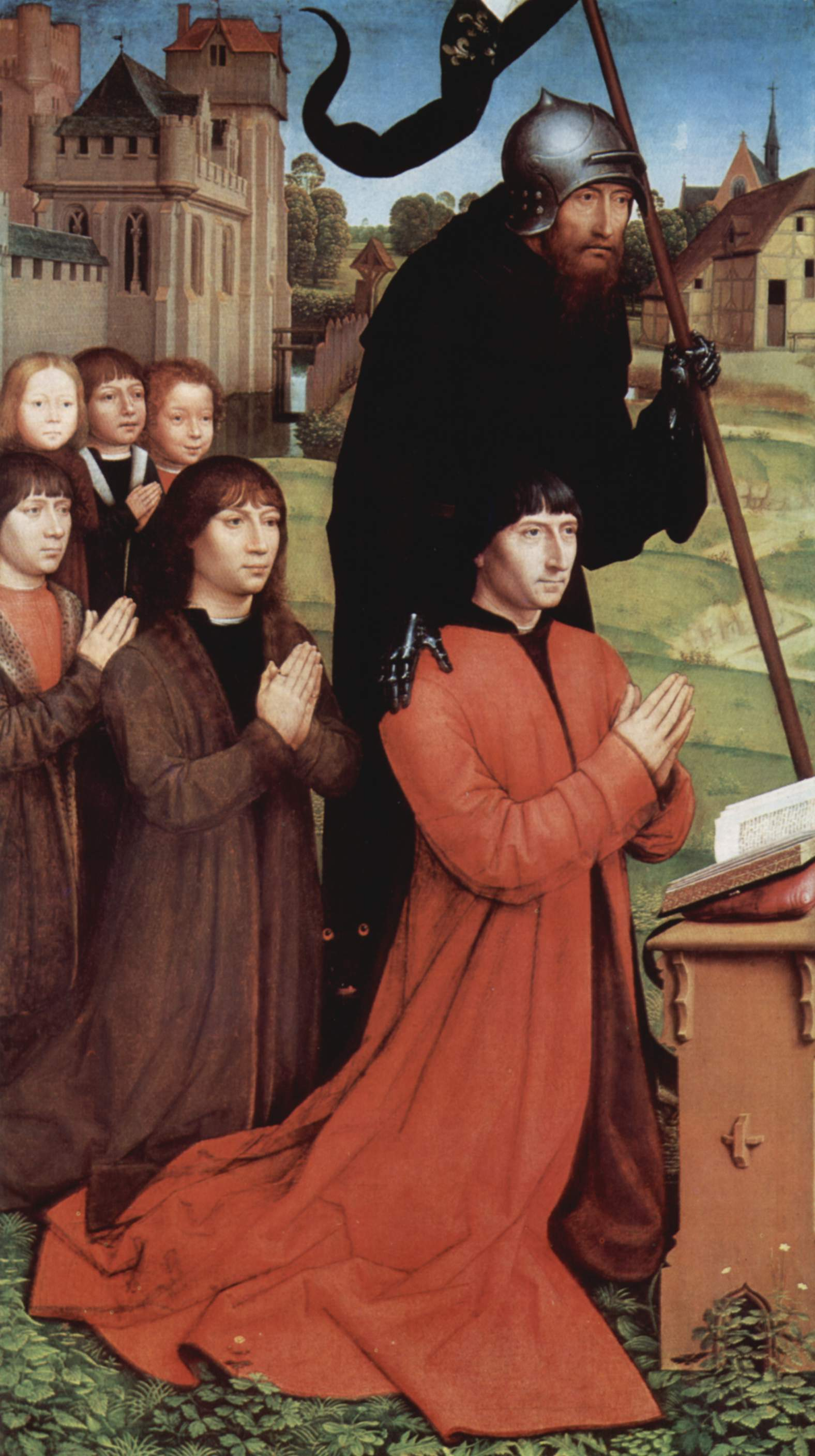
Male side panel of Hans Memling's Triptych of Wilhelm Moreel; the father is supported by his patron saint, with his five sons behind him. The central panel is here.

The purpose of donor portraits was to memorialize the donor and his family, and especially to solicit prayers for them after their death. Gifts to the church of buildings, altarpieces, or large areas of stained glass were often accompanied by a bequest or condition that masses for the donor be said in perpetuity, and portraits of the persons concerned were thought to encourage prayers on their behalf during these, and at other times. Displaying portraits in a public place was also an expression of social status; donor portraits overlapped with tomb monuments in churches, the other main way of achieving these ends, although donor portraits had the advantage that the donor could see them displayed in his own lifetime.

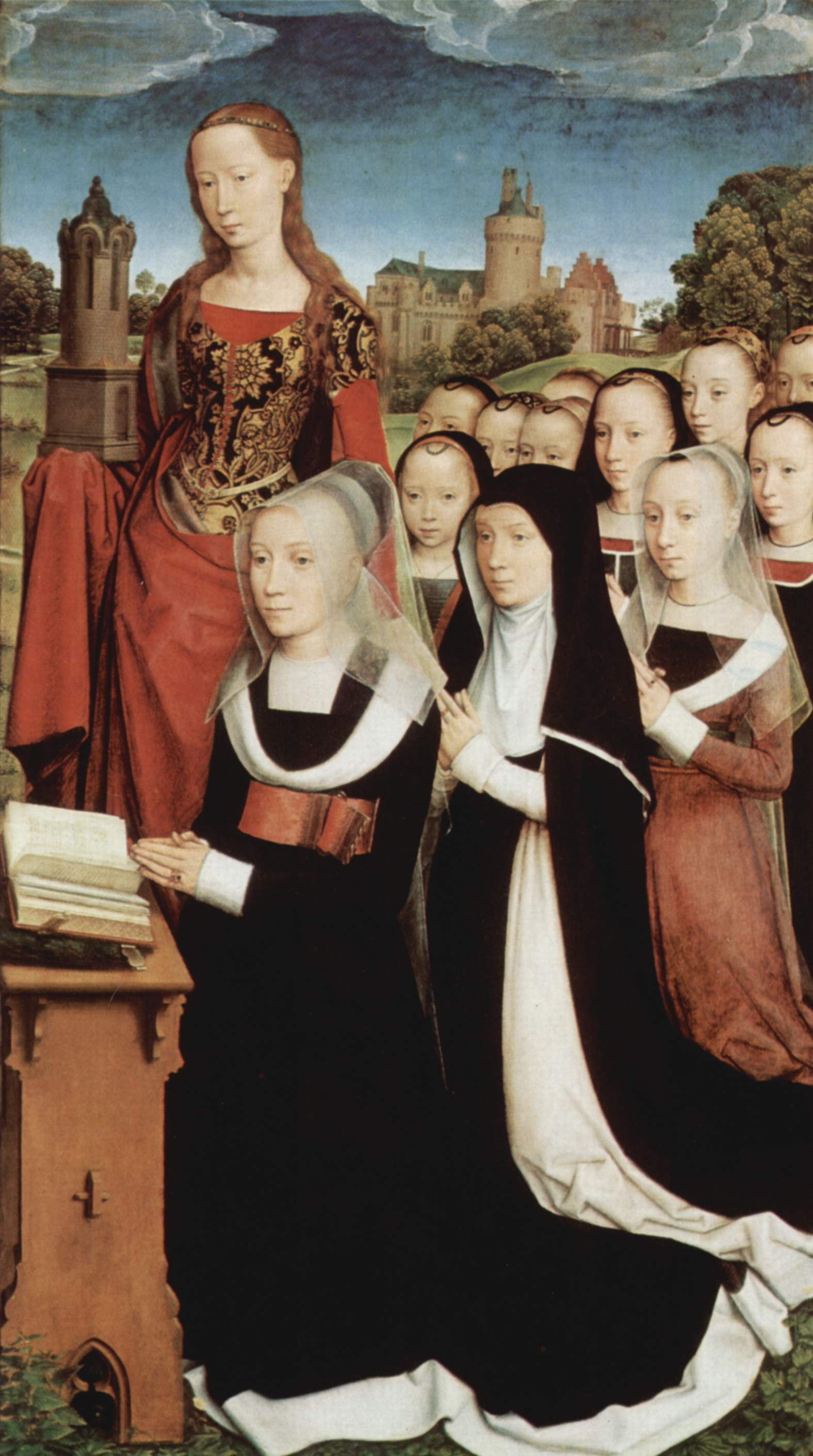
Female side of Memling's Triptych of Wilhelm Moreel, the mother, Barbara Van Hertsvelde is supported by her patron saint, with her eleven daughters behind her. The central panel is here.

Furthermore, donor portraits in Early Netherlandish painting suggest that their additional purpose was to serve as role models for the praying beholder during his own emotional meditation and prayer – not in order to be imitated as ideal persons like the painted Saints but to serve as a mirror for the recipient to reflect on himself and his sinful status, ideally leading him to a knowledge of himself and God. To do so during prayer is in accord with late medieval concepts of prayer, fully developed by the Modern Devotion. This process may be intensified if the praying beholder is the donor himself.

When a whole building was financed, a sculpture of the patron might be included on the facade or elsewhere in the building. Jan van Eyck's Rolin Madonna is a small painting where the donor Nicolas Rolin shares the painting space equally with the Madonna and Child, but Rolin had given great sums to his parish church, where it was hung, which is represented by the church above his praying hands in the townscape behind him.

Sometimes, as in the Ghent Altarpiece, the donors were shown on the closed view of an altarpiece with movable wings, or on both the side panels, as in the Portinari Altarpiece and the Memlings above, or just on one side, as in the Mérode Altarpiece. If they are on different sides, the males are normally on the left for the viewer, the honorific right-hand placement within the picture space. In family groups the figures are usually divided by gender. Groups of members of confraternities, sometimes with their wives, are also found. Additional family members, from births or marriages, might be added later, and deaths might be recorded by the addition of small crosses held in the clasped hands.

At least in Northern Italy, as well as the grand altarpieces and frescos by leading masters that attract most art-historical attention, there was a more numerous group of small frescoes with a single saint and donor on side-walls, that were liable to be re-painted as soon as the number of candles lit before them fell off, or a wealthy donor needed the space for a large fresco-cycle, as portrayed in a 15th-century tale from Italy:

And going around with the master mason, examining which figures to leave and which to destroy, the priest spotted a Saint Anthony and said: 'Save this one.' Then he found a figure of Saint Sano and said: 'This one is to be gotten rid of, since as long as I have been the Priest here I have never seen anyone light a candle in front of it, nor has it ever seemed to me useful; therefore, mason, get rid of it.'

== History ==
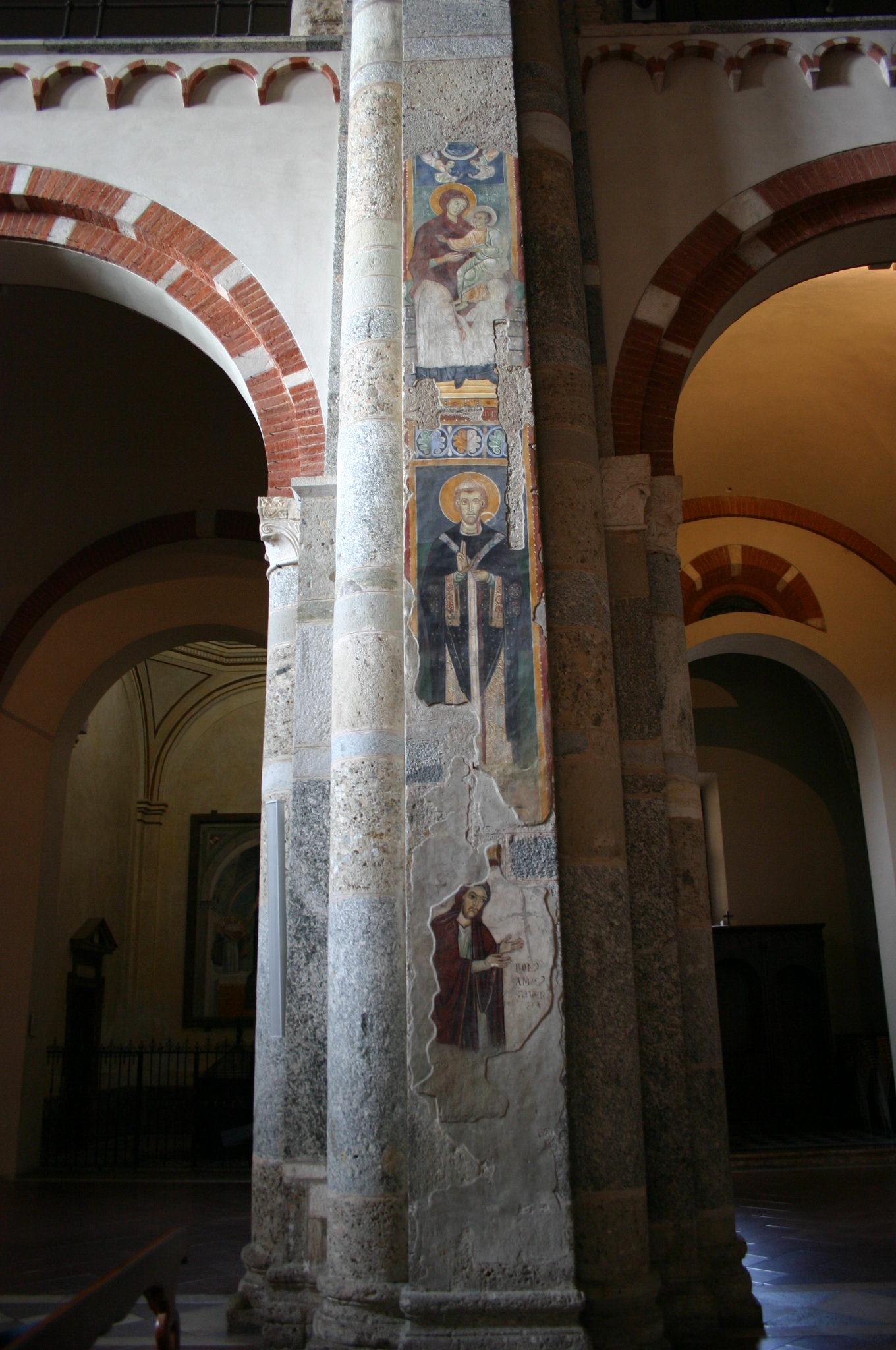
13th-century frescoes from Milan: Madonna and Child, Saint Ambrose, and the donor Bonamico Taverna)

Donor portraits have a continuous history from late antiquity, and the portrait in the 6th-century manuscript the Vienna Dioscurides may well reflect a long-established classical tradition, just as the author portraits found in the same manuscript are believed to do. A painting in the Catacombs of Commodilla of 528 shows a throned Virgin and Child flanked by two saints, with Turtura, a female donor, in front of the left hand saint, who has his hand on her shoulder; very similar compositions were being produced a millennium later. Another tradition which had pre-Christian precedent was royal or imperial images showing the ruler with a religious figure, usually Christ or the Virgin Mary in Christian examples, with the divine and royal figures shown communicating with each other in some way. Although none have survived, there is literary evidence of donor portraits in small chapels from the Early Christian period, probably continuing the traditions of pagan temples.

The 6th-century mosaic panels in the Basilica of San Vitale in Ravenna of the Emperor Justinian I and Empress Theodora with courtiers are not of the type showing the ruler receiving divine approval, but each show one of the imperial couple standing confidently with a group of attendants, looking out at the viewer. Their scale and composition are alone among large-scale survivals. Also in Ravenna, there is a small mosaic of Justinian, possibly originally of Theoderic the Great in the Basilica of Sant'Apollinare Nuovo. In the Early Middle Ages, a group of mosaic portraits in Rome of Popes who had commissioned the building or rebuilding of the churches containing them show standing figures holding models of the building, usually among a group of saints. Gradually these traditions worked their way down the social scale, especially in illuminated manuscripts, where they are often owner portraits, as the manuscripts were retained for use by the person commissioning them. For example, a chapel at Mals in South Tyrol has two fresco donor figures from before 881, one lay and the other of a tonsured cleric holding a model building. In subsequent centuries bishops, abbots and other clergy were the donors most commonly shown, other than royalty, and they remained prominently represented in later periods.

Donor portraits of noblemen and wealthy businessmen were becoming common in commissions by the 15th century, at the same time as the panel portrait was beginning to be commissioned by this class - though there are perhaps more donor portraits in larger works from churches surviving from before 1450 than panel portraits. A very common Netherlandish format from the mid-century was a small diptych with a Madonna and Child, usually on the left wing, and a "donor" on the right - the donor being here an owner, as these were normally intended to be kept in the subject's home. In these the portrait may adopt a praying pose, or may pose more like the subject in a purely secular portrait. The Wilton Diptych of Richard II of England was a forerunner of these. In some of these diptychs the portrait of the original owner has been over-painted with that of a later one.

A particular convention in illuminated manuscripts was the "presentation portrait", where the manuscript began with a figure, often kneeling, presenting the manuscript to its owner, or sometimes the owner commissioning the book. The person presenting might be a courtier making a gift to his prince, but is often the author or the scribe, in which cases the recipient had actually paid for the manuscript.

== Iconography of painted donor figures ==
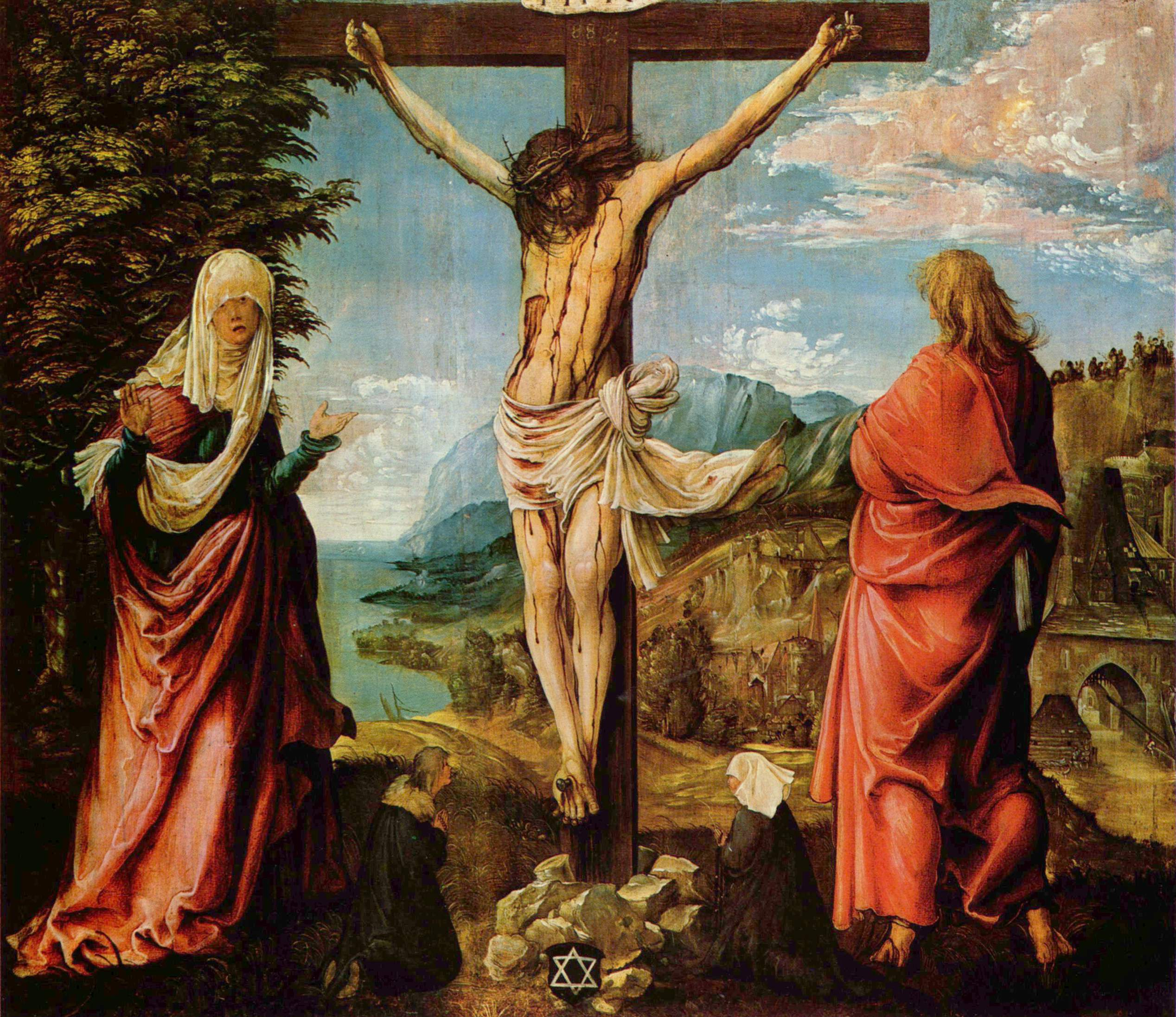
Crucifixion by Albrecht Altdorfer, c. 1514, with a tiny donor couple among the feet of the main figures. Altdorfer was one of the last major artists to retain this convention.

During the Middle Ages the donor figures often were shown on a far smaller scale than the sacred figures; a change dated by Dirk Kocks to the 14th century, though earlier examples in manuscripts can be found. A later convention was for figures at about three-quarters of the size of the main ones. From the 15th century Early Netherlandish painters like Jan van Eyck integrated, with varying degrees of subtlety, donor portraits into the space of the main scene of altarpieces, at the same scale as the main figures.

A comparable style can be found in Florentine painting from the same date, as in Masaccio's Holy Trinity (1425–28) in Santa Maria Novella where, however, the donors are shown kneeling on a sill outside and below the main architectural setting. This innovation, however, did not appear in Venetian painting until the turn of the next century. Normally the main figures ignore the presence of the interlopers in narrative scenes, although bystanding saints may put a supportive hand on the shoulder in a side-panel. But in devotional subjects such as a Madonna and Child, which were more likely to have been intended for the donor's home, the main figures may look at or bless the donor, as in the Memling shown.

Before the 15th century a physical likeness may not have often been attempted, or achieved; the individuals depicted may in any case often not have been available to the artist, or even alive. By the mid-15th century this was no longer the case, and donors of whom other likenesses survive can often be seen to be carefully portrayed, although, as in the Memling above, daughters in particular often appear as standardized beauties in the style of the day.

Presentation of Christ, ca 1470. Standing alongside the Holy Family, the two fashionably dressed girls, and probably the young man on the right, are donor portraits.

In narrative scenes they began to be worked into the figures of the scene depicted, perhaps an innovation of Rogier van der Weyden, where they can often be distinguished by their expensive contemporary dress. In Florence, where there was already a tradition of including portraits of city notables in crowd scenes (mentioned by Leon Battista Alberti), the Procession of the Magi by Benozzo Gozzoli (1459–61), which admittedly was in the private chapel of the Palazzo Medici, is dominated by the glamorous procession containing more portraits of the Medici and their allies than can now be identified. By 1490, when the large Tornabuoni Chapel fresco cycle by Domenico Ghirlandaio was completed, family members and political allies of the Tornabuoni populate several scenes in considerable numbers, in addition to conventional kneeling portraits of Giovanni Tornabuoni and his wife. In an often-quoted passage, John Pope-Hennessy caricatured 16th-century Italian donors:

the vogue of the collective portrait grew and grew ... status and portraiture became inextricably entwined, and there was almost nothing patrons would not do to intrude themselves in paintings; they would stone the women taken in adultery, they would clean up after martyrdoms, they would serve at the table at Emmaus or in the Pharisee's house. The elders in the story of Suzannah were some of the few figures respectable Venetians were unwilling to impersonate. ... the only contingency they did not envisage was what actually occurred, that their faces would survive but their names go astray.

In Italy donors, or owners, were rarely depicted as the major religious figures, but in the courts of Northern Europe there are several examples of this in the late 15th and early 16th centuries, mostly in small panels not for public viewing. The most notorious of these is the portrayal as the Virgin lactans (or just post-lactans) of Agnès Sorel (died 1450), the mistress of Charles VII of France, in a panel by Jean Fouquet.

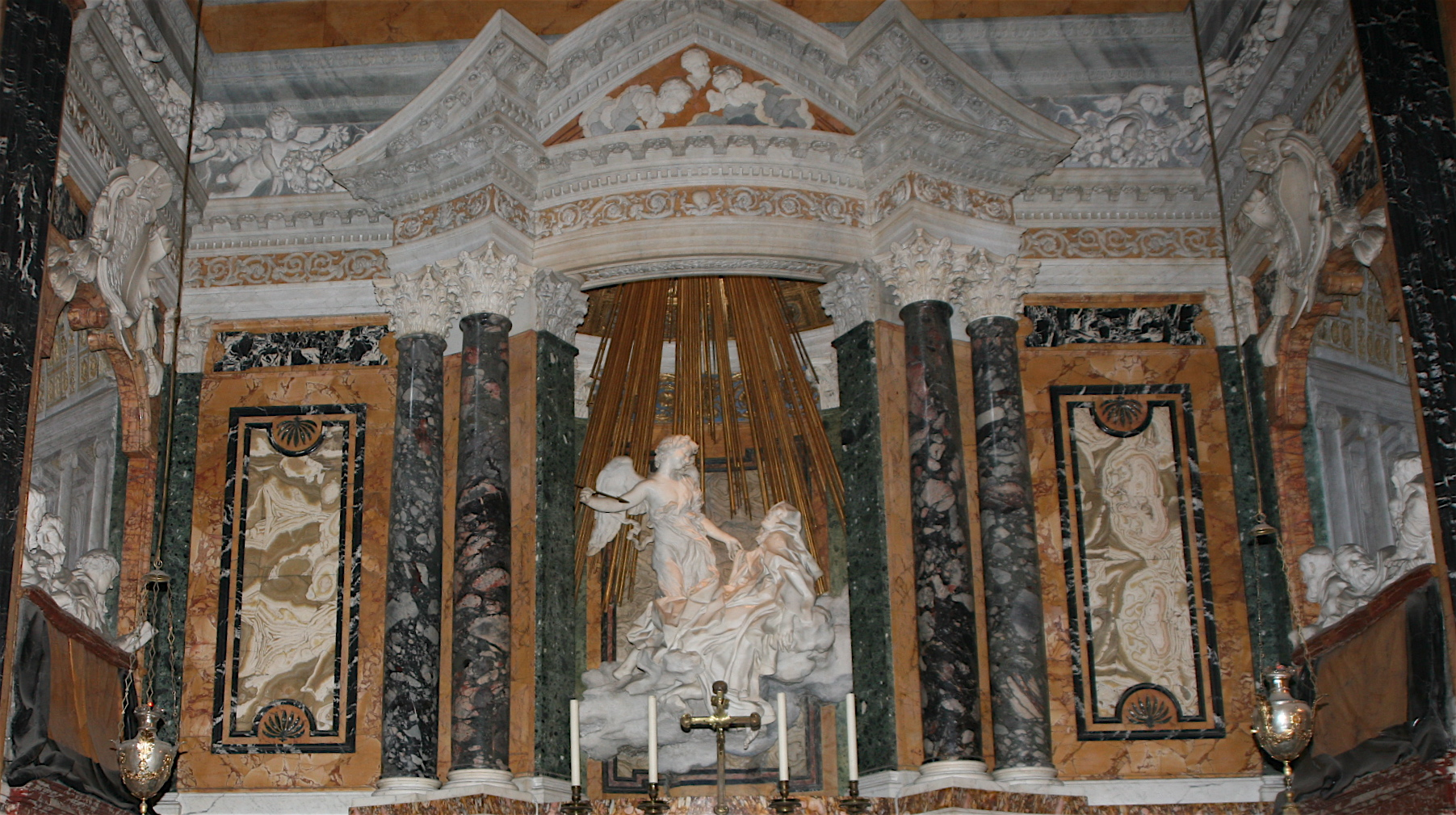
Gian Lorenzo Bernini's "Ecstasy of St. Theresa", Santa Maria della Vittoria, Rome.

Donor portraits in works for churches, and over-prominent heraldry, were disapproved of by clerical interpreters of the vague decrees on art of the Council of Trent, such as Saint Charles Borromeo, but survived well into the Baroque period, and developed a secular equivalent in history painting, although here it was often the principal figures who were given the features of the commissioner. A very late example of the old Netherlandish format of the triptych with the donors on the wing panels is Rubens' Rockox Triptych of 1613–15, once in a church over the tombstone of the donors and now in the Royal Museum of Fine Arts, Antwerp. The central panel shows the Incredulity of Thomas ("Doubting Thomas") and the work as a whole is ambiguous as to whether the donors are represented as occupying the same space as the sacred scene, with different indications in both directions.

A further secular development was the portrait historié, where groups of portrait sitters posed as historical or mythological figures. One of the most famous and striking groups of Baroque donor portraits are those of the male members of the Cornaro family, who sit in boxes as if at the theatre to either side of the sculpted altarpiece of Gian Lorenzo Bernini's Ecstasy of St Theresa (1652). These were derived from frescoes by Pellegrino Tibaldi a century early, which use the same conceit.

Although donor portraits have been relatively little studied as a distinct genre, there has been more interest in recent years, and a debate over their relationship, in Italy, to the rise of individualism with the Early Renaissance, and also over the changes in their iconography after the Black Death of the mid-14th century.

== Gallery ==
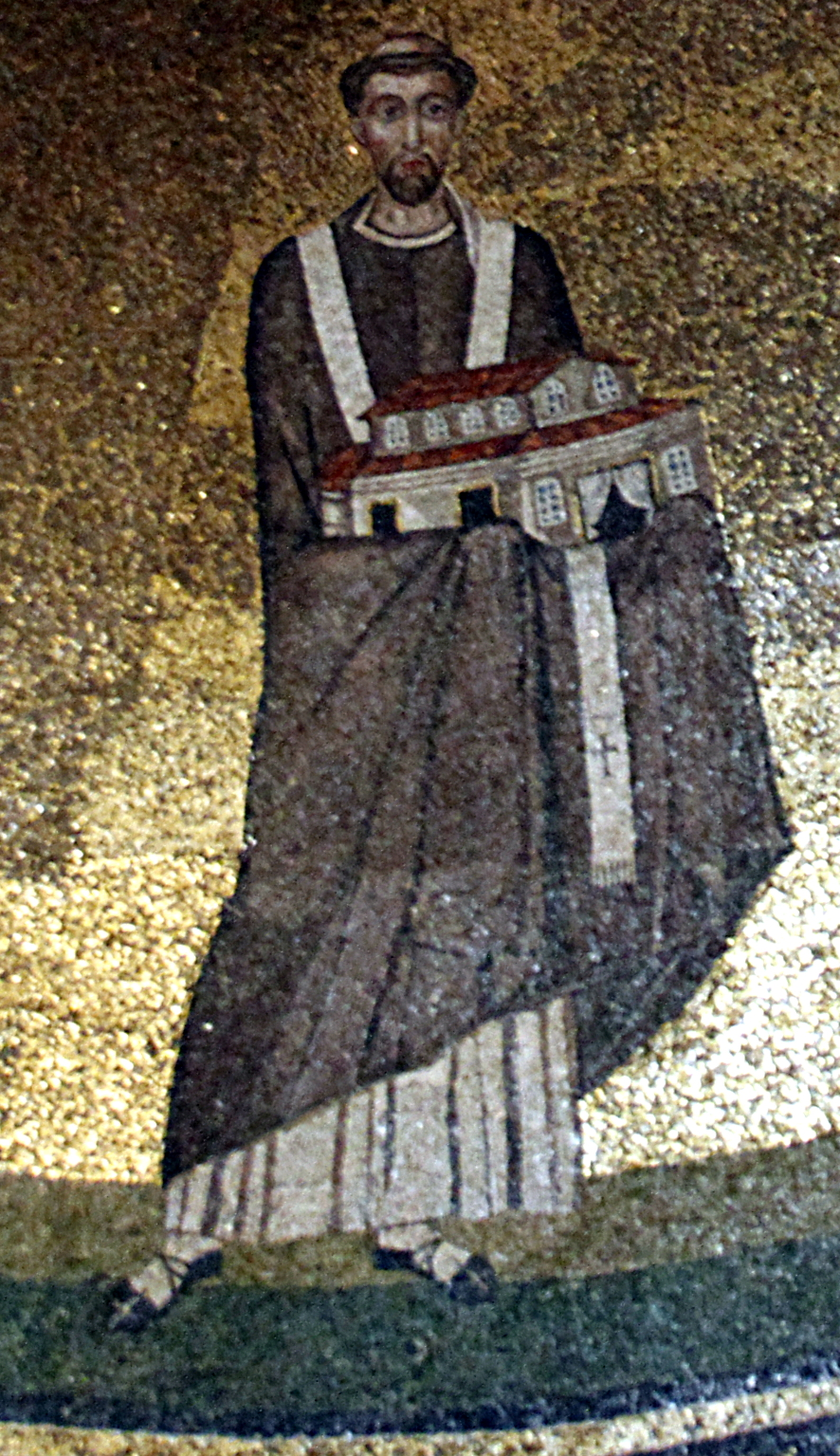
Pope Honorius I (died 638), mosaic in Sant'Agnese fuori le Mura in Rome, carrying a model of the church he built.

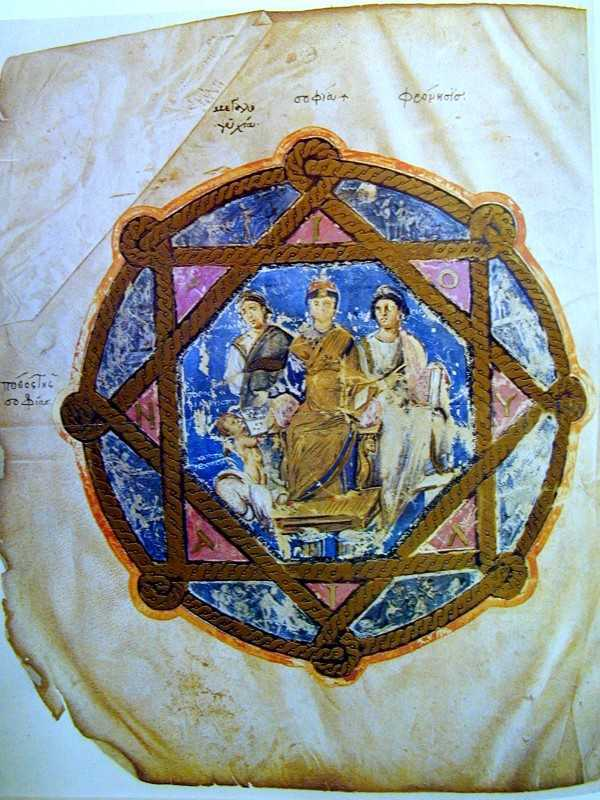
6th-century donor portrait of Anicia Juliana, the Byzantine princess who commissioned the illuminated manuscript known as the Vienna Dioscurides.

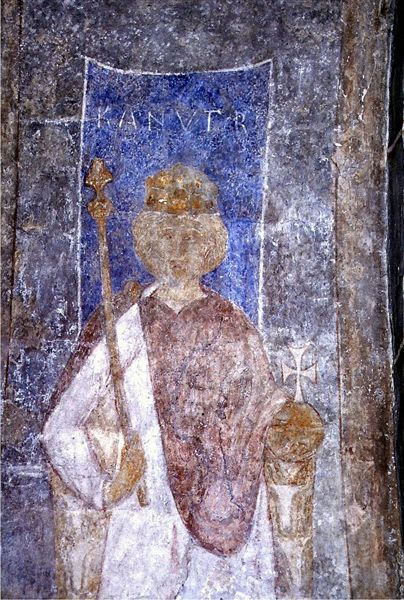
12th-century mural with donor portrait of King Canute VI of Denmark in Stehag Church, Sweden.

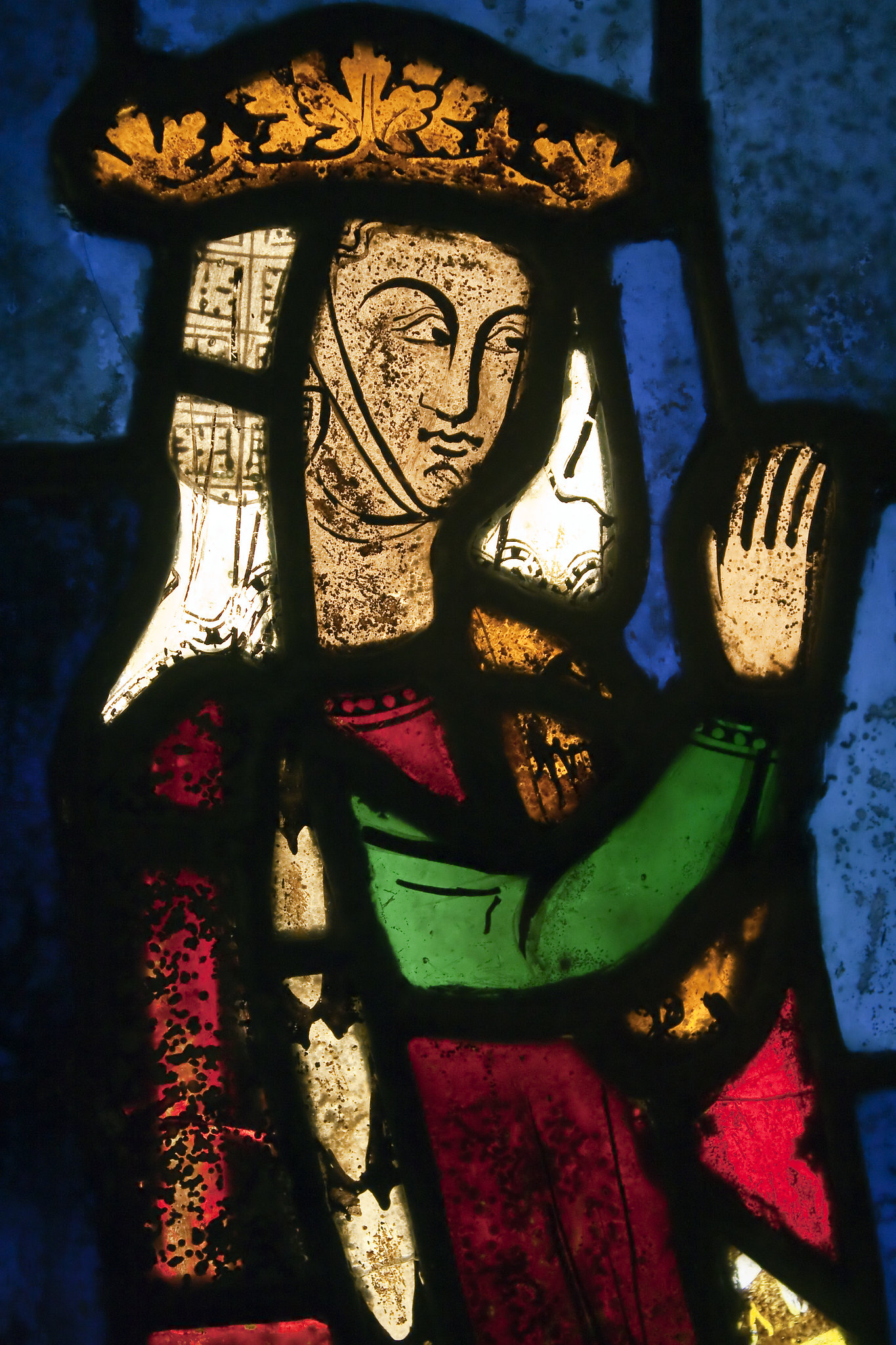
Stained-glass window depicting Beatrice of Falkenburg (died 1277) as benefactress to the Franciscans, is the earliest surviving stained-glass donor portrait (Burrell Collection).

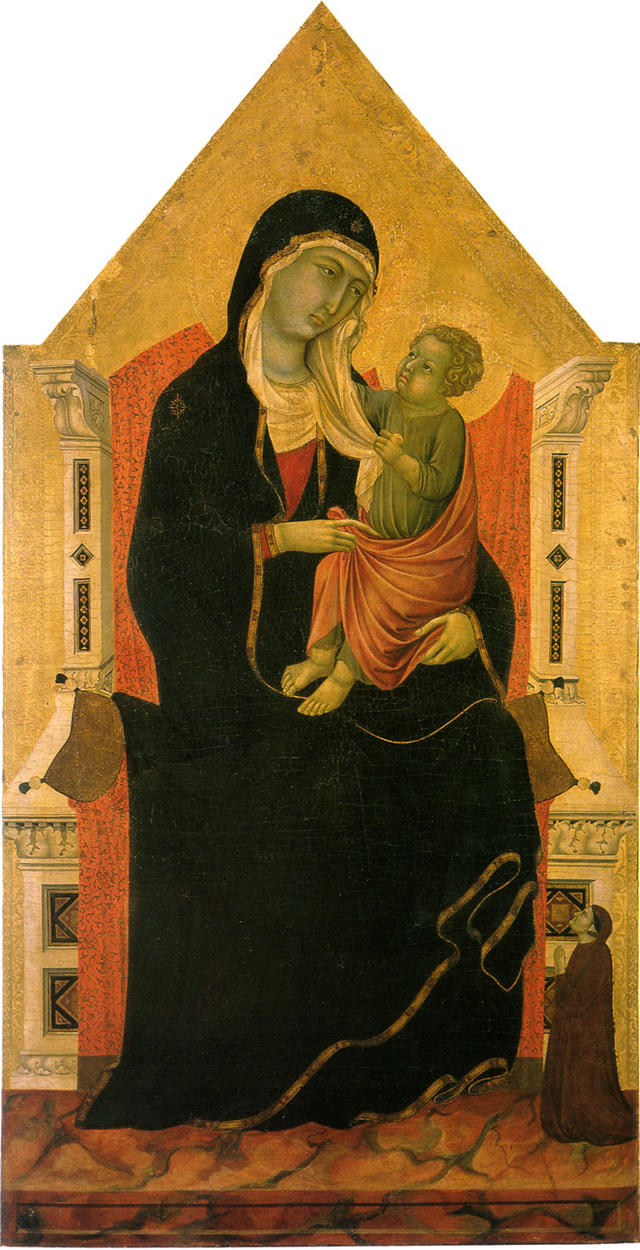
Small donor with enthroned Madonna and Child, ca 1335

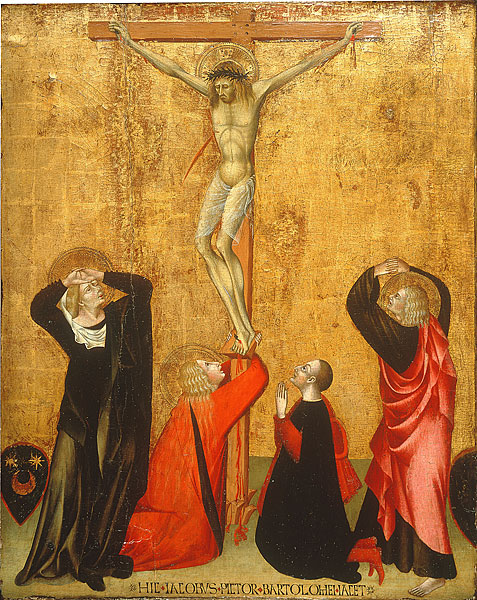
Giovanni di Paolo's Crucifixion with donor Jacopo di Bartolomeo, named in the inscription and with his coat of arms at left

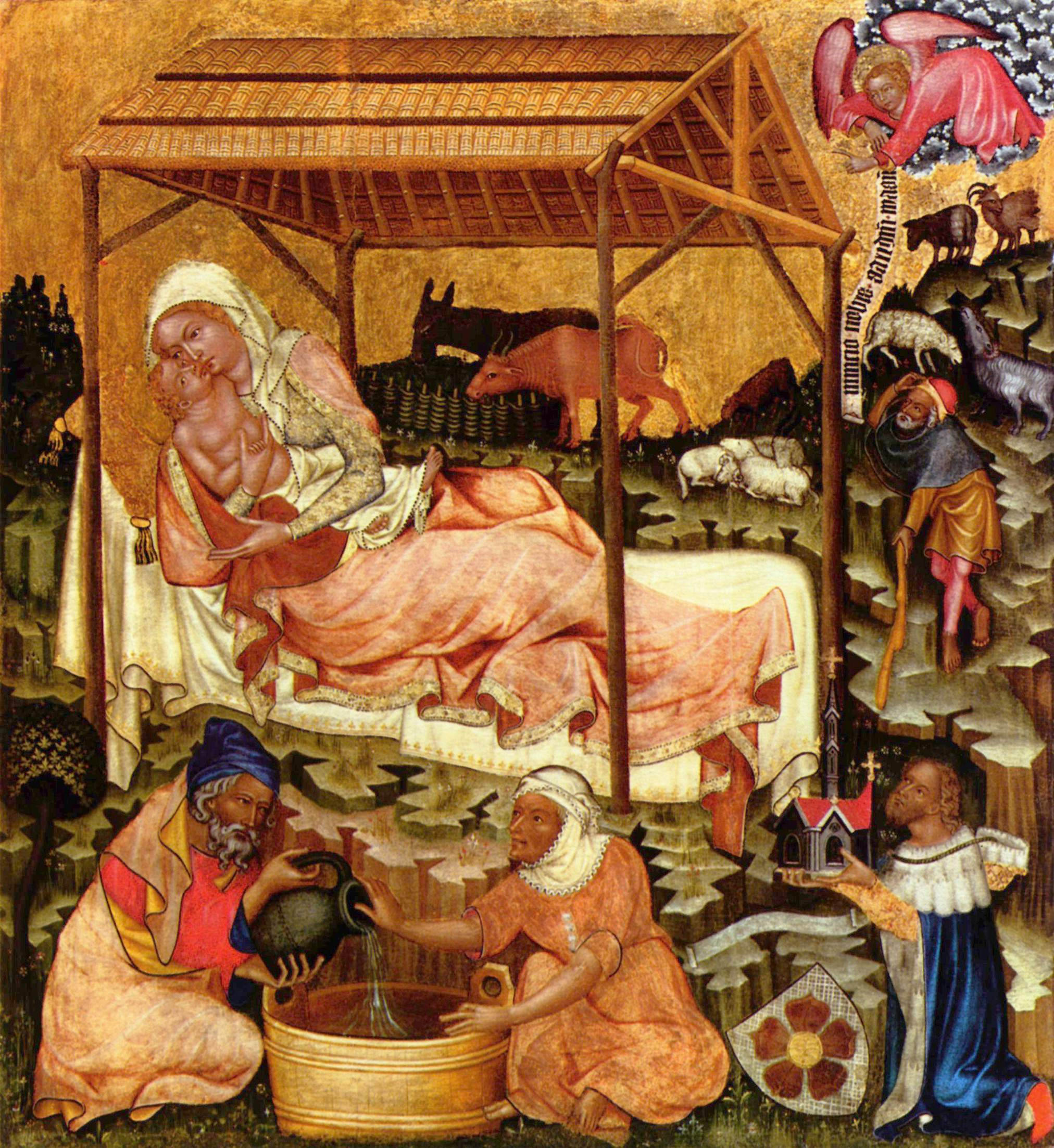
Master of Vyšší Brod, a Bohemian master, ca. 1350, with donor portrait of Charles IV, Holy Roman Emperor holding a miniature church, as he had presumably paid for the whole building the painting was intended for.

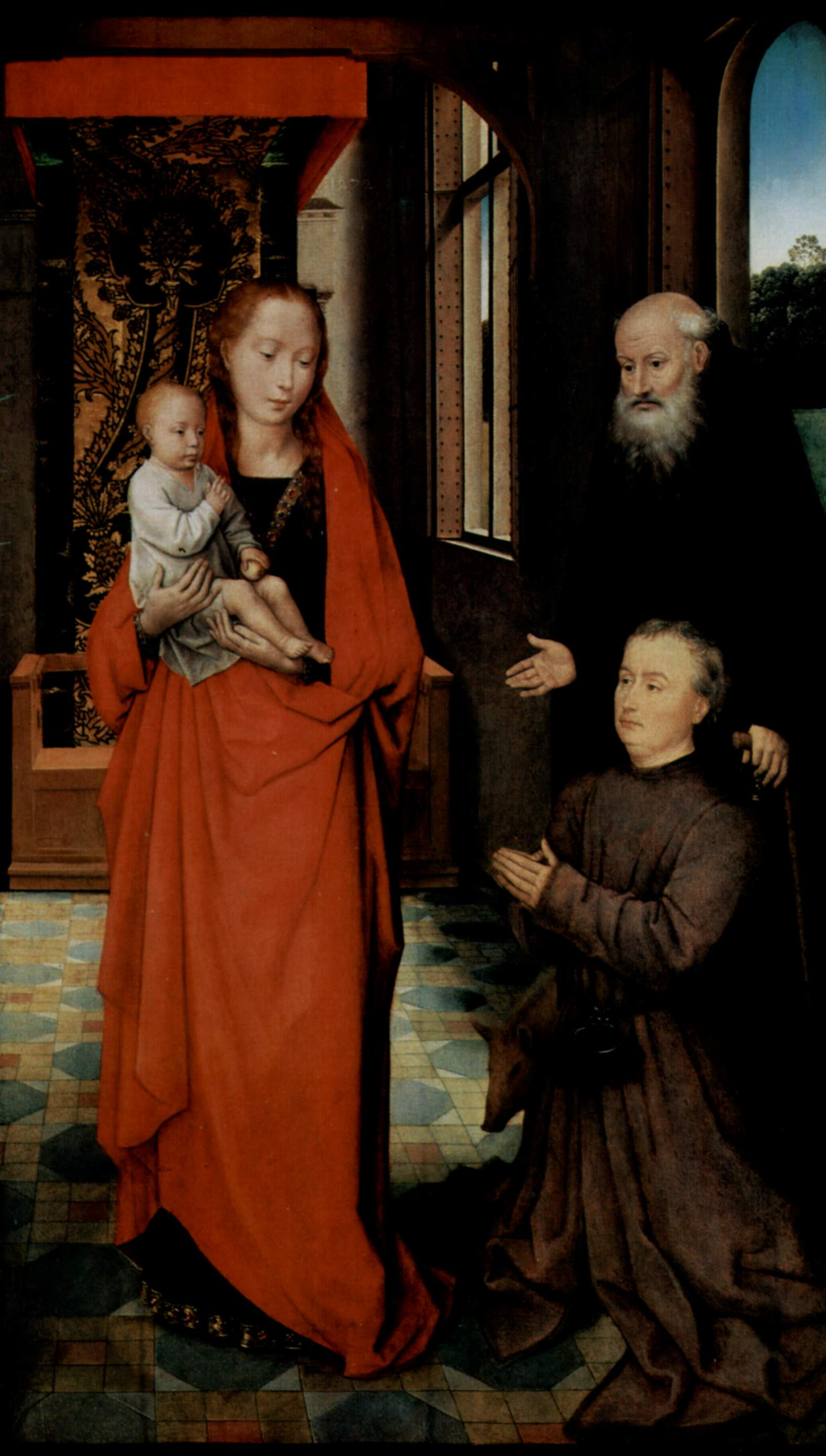
Hans Memling; the Madonna looks benevolently at the donor, who is presented by Saint Anthony the Great, and blessed by the Christ-child

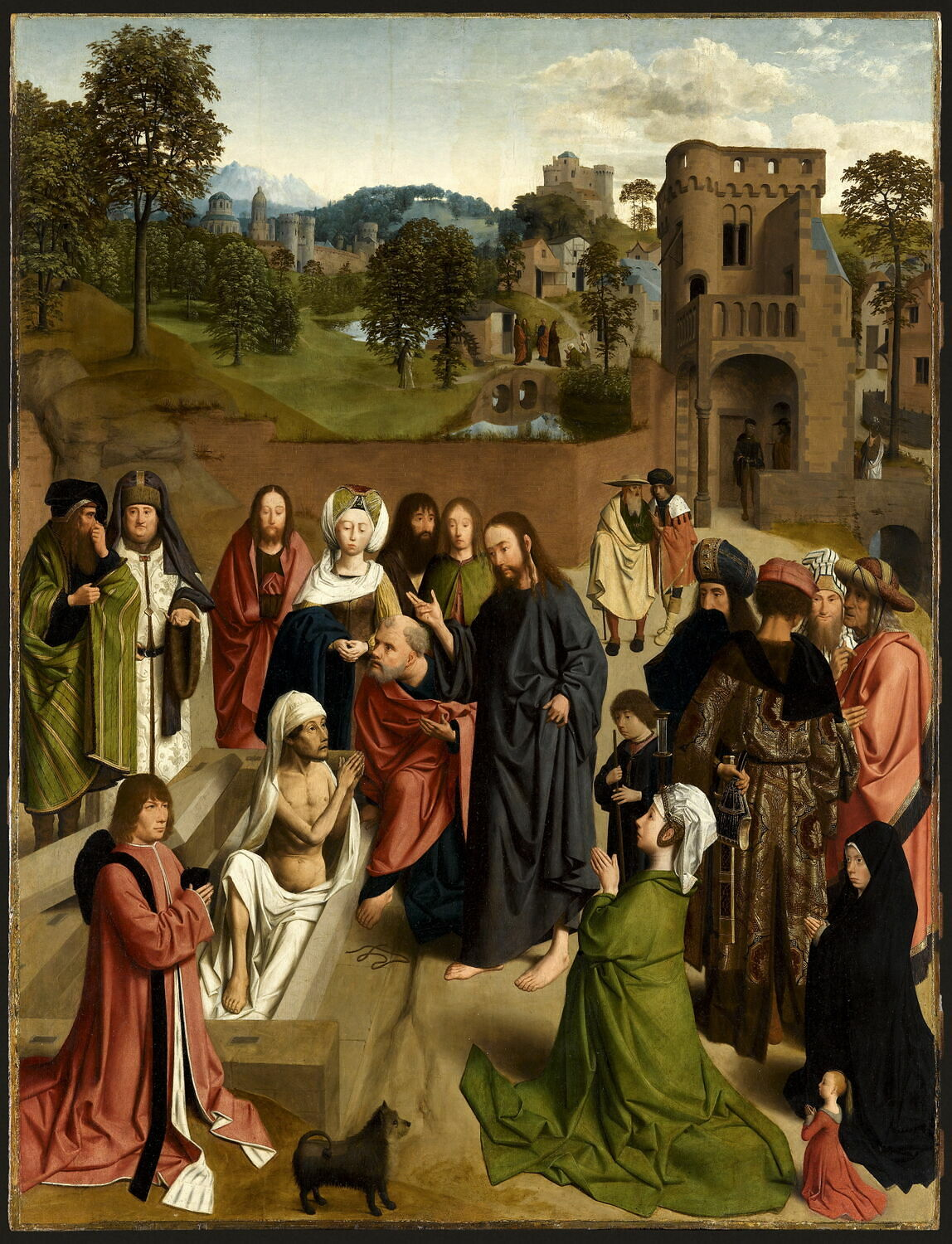
Geertgen tot Sint Jans, Raising of Lazarus, with five kneeling donor portraits (and perhaps the donor's dog). The very small girl was perhaps an infant death or a later addition to the family and the painting

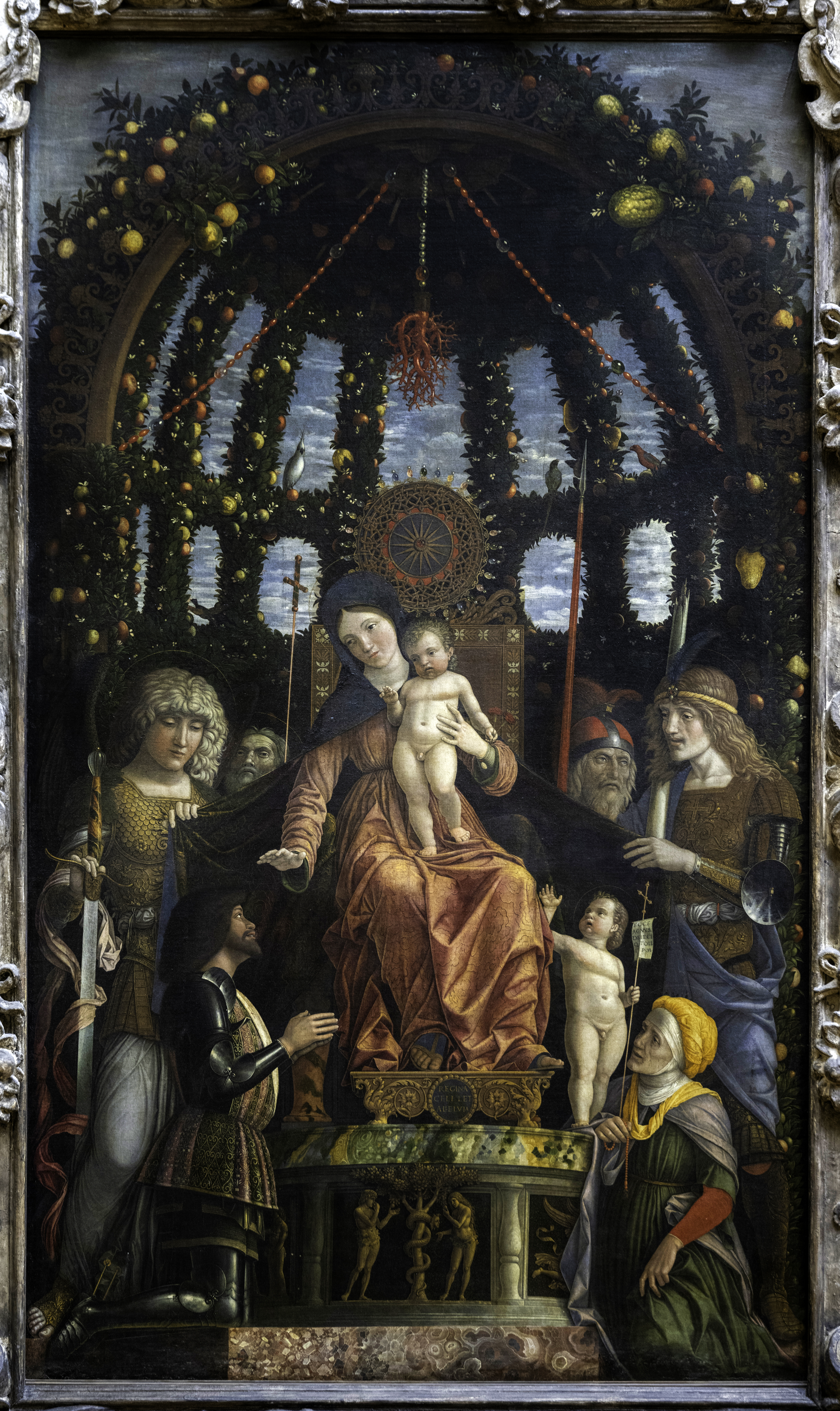
Andrea Mantegna's Madonna della Vittoria (c. 1496), with Francesco II Gonzaga.

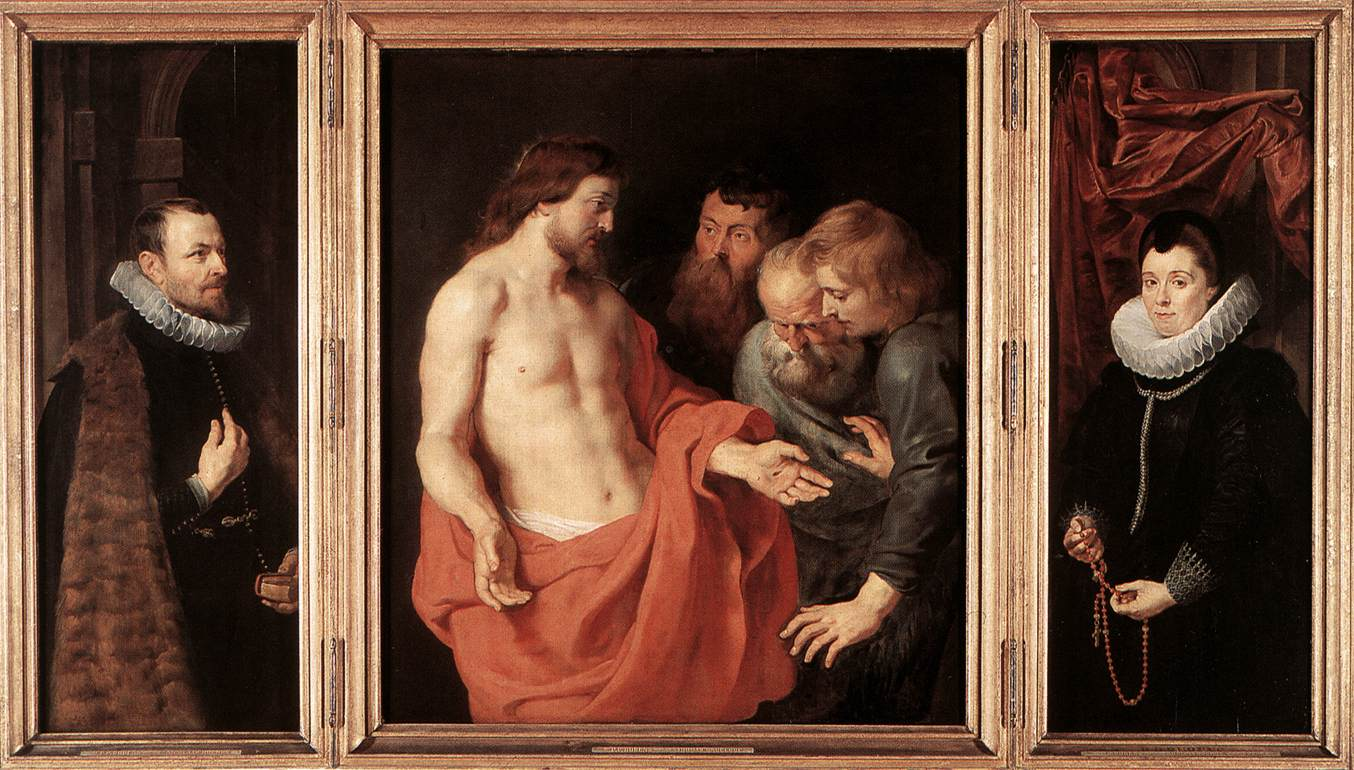
Rubens, Rockox Triptych, 1613–15

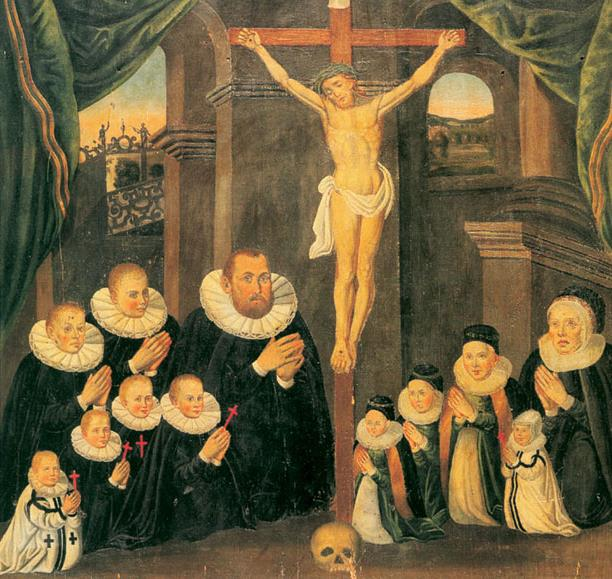
A prosperous glassmaker and his family, 1596. The five children holding crosses had died; the two in black-trimmed white garments apparently before the painting was done, on the others the crosses were probably added later.
