= Stehag Church =

- Stehags kyrka
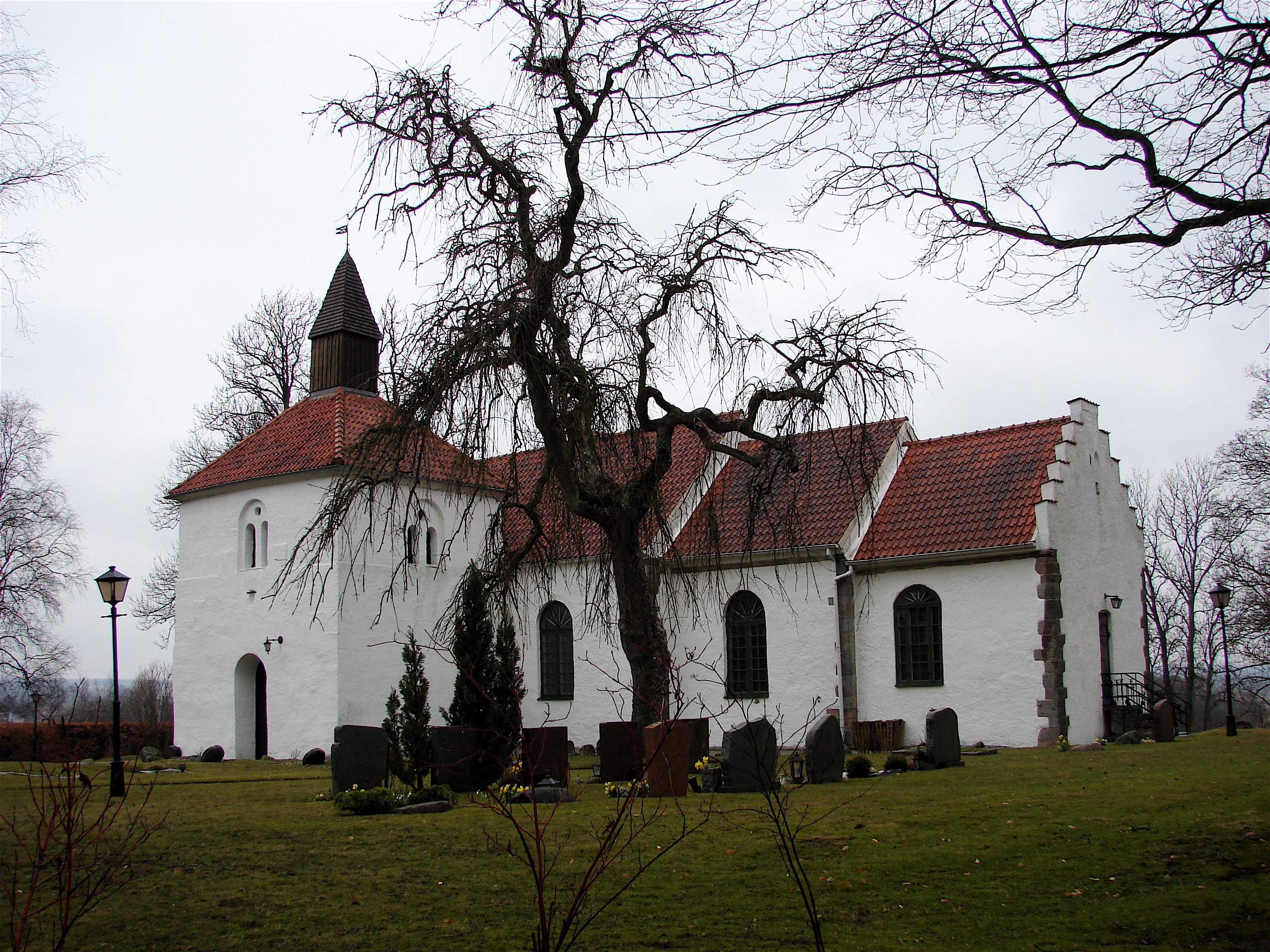
- Stehag Church

- Location within Skåne Location within Sweden
- 55°53′51″N 13°24′57″E
- Country: Sweden
- Denomination: Church of Sweden

Stehag Church (Swedish: Stehags kyrka) is a medieval church in Stehag, Scania, Sweden. It belongs to the Church of Sweden. It contains Romanesque church murals with royal donor portraits.

== History ==
The church in Stehag was built during the third quarter of the 12th century. Originally the church consisted of a nave, chancel and apse; parts of the original northern portal still survive. Some of the stones used to build the church contain mason's marks identical to some found in Lund Cathedral, as well as the signature Johannes, so it has been assumed that the master mason of the church had worked at the construction site of the cathedral and was named Johannes. A tomb under the floor of the choir bears the name Jakob; it is probably the tomb of the builder of the church. In the 14th century, the chancel was enlarged and a church porch built in front of the southern entrance. In the 14th and 16th centuries, the earlier ceiling of the church was replaced with vaults. After the Middle Ages the nave was enlarged in 1727, and the windows replaced in 1778. A burial chapel for the Coyet family was built in 1803. In 1848 the church porch was transformed into the current squat tower, and in 1853 the church was enlarged to the north. Repairs and restorations have been carried out in 1911, 1968–69, 1985 and 1997.

== Murals and furnishings ==
The choir walls contains Romanesque wall paintings depicting Mary, Christ and saints. There are also two donor portraits of Canute VI of Denmark and an archbishop, possibly Absalon. This may indicate that the church was commissioned by the archbishop.

The baptismal font of the church is from the end of the 12th century and made by another artisan from the cathedral workshop in Lund, Mårten stenmästare. The other furnishings are from the time after the Reformation. The altar has a decorated antependium from 1607. The altarpiece is also from the early 17th century. Some pews from 1574 displaying the coats of arms of the families to which they belonged are also preserved in the church. The pulpit is from the middle of the 18th century.
