= Friedrich family =

German-Bohemian glass-maker family

The Friedrich are the most ancient German-Bohemian glass-maker family.

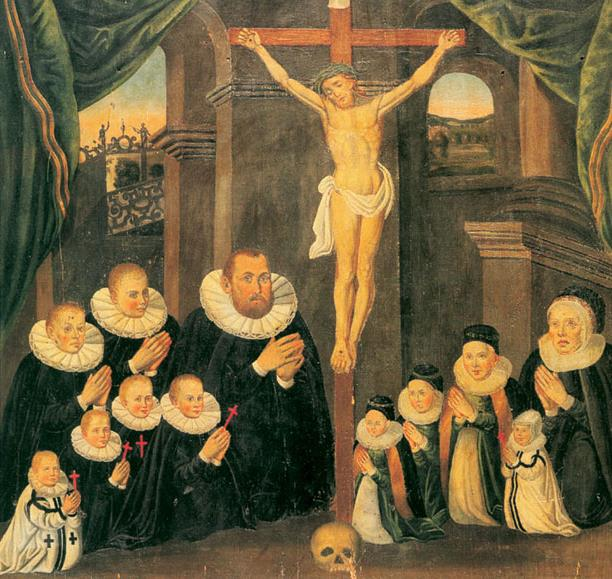
Votive portrait of the Northern Bohemian Glassworks Master Martin Friedrich the Younger and his Family (about 1596).

== History ==
From as early as 750 years ago, the shadowy picture of the oldest German-Bohemian glass-maker family Friedrich emerges, who contributed greatly towards the creation of the world-famous Bohemian glass (also called Bohemian Crystal). In pre-Hussite times they produced amazing works of vitreous art near Daubitz, nowadays called Doubice. During the 16th and 17th centuries, as a result of the family’s development of their glass factory in Oberkreibitz, today Horní Chribská, Bohemian glass art enjoyed its first heyday.

The expansion of this glass-maker family over many European countries is unparalleled. Its hut master dynasties together with the Schierer von Walthaimb family made glass history in Bohemia, Silesia, Austria, Tyrol and Slovenia. Its glass-makers proved their artistic skills and technological experience in Brandenburg, Saxony, Thuringia, Bavaria, Styria, Slovakia, Croatia and so on. The well-known glass artist Friedrich Egermann also ranked among the family’s descendants as the natural historian and explorer of South America Thaddäus Haenke.

== Bibliography ==
- Walter A. Friedrich: Die Wurzeln der nordböhmischen Glasindustrie und die Glasmacherfamilie Friedrich. Fürth (Germany) 2005, published by the author. ISBN 3-00-015752-2

== See also ==
- Ostsiedlung
- Sudeten Germans
