= Ústí nad Labem Zoo =

Ústí nad Labem Zoological Gardens
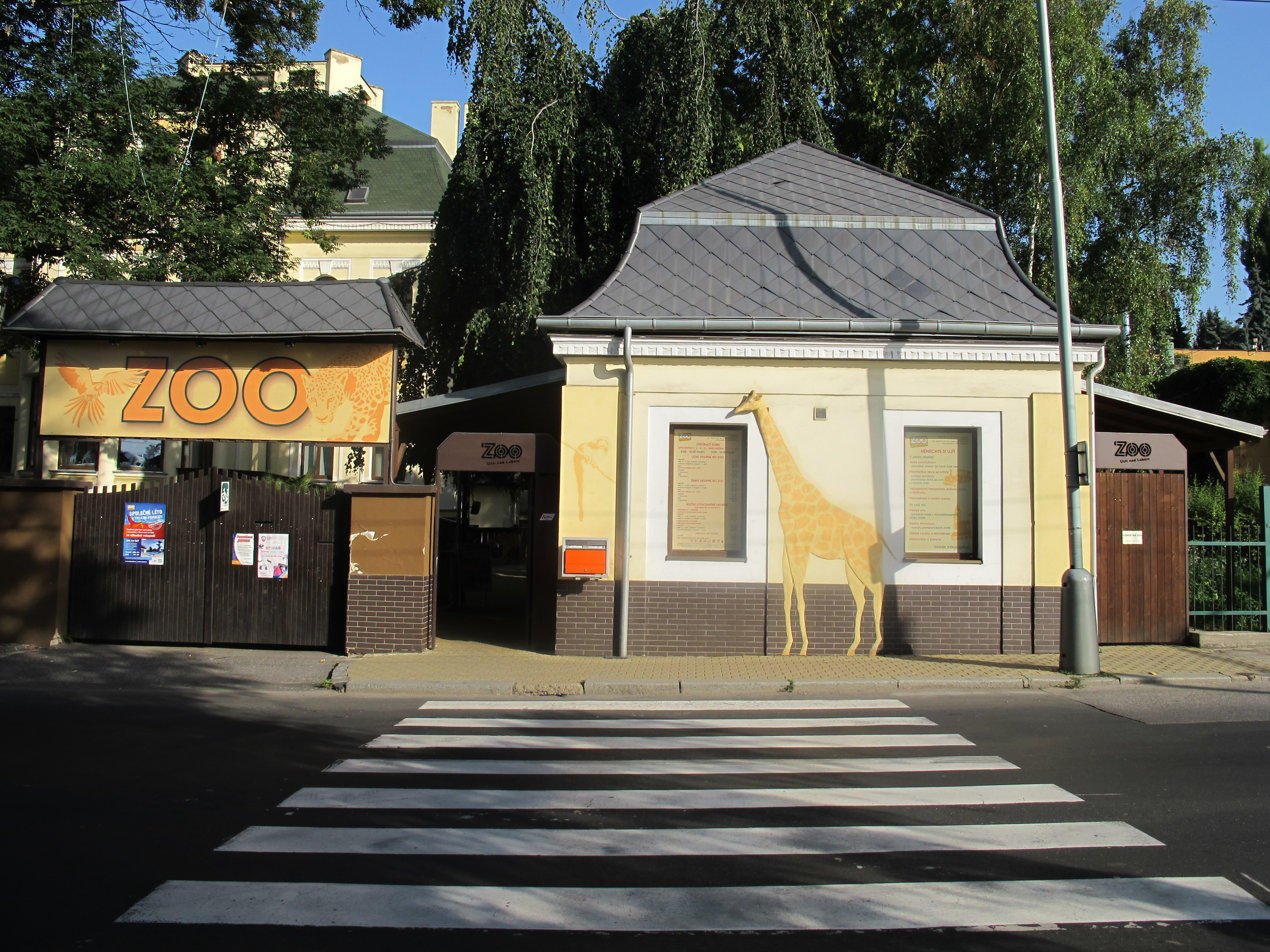
- Ústí nad Labem Zoological Gardens
- Interactive map of Ústí nad Labem Zoological Gardens
- 50°39′51.27″N 14°3′41.51″E
- Date opened: 1908
- Location: Ústí nad Labem, Czech Republic
- Land area: 26 ha (64 acres)
- No. of animals: 1,500
- No. of species: 240
- Memberships: EAZA, WAZA, UCSZ
- Website: www.zoousti.cz

Ústí nad Labem Zoological Gardens is a zoo located on the edge of Krásné Březno, close to the centre of the city of Ústí nad Labem in the Czech Republic. The gardens cover an area of 26 ha (64 acres), and lets visitors view rare and endangered species of animals such as orangutans, Somali donkeys, rhinoceroses, and Malaysian sun bears. Open throughout the year, the gardens host regular displays—the training of sea lions, a parade of elephants through the gardens, flying display of birds of prey, rides on ponies, and a range of other activities.

The zoo is a member of the European Association of Zoos and Aquaria (EAZA), the World Association of Zoos and Aquariums (WAZA), and the Union of Czech and Slovak Zoological Gardens (UCSZ).

Both the upper gate (Dobětice) and the lower main gate (Krásné Březno) include ticket offices, but during the winter season the upper ticket office is closed.

== History ==
The Zoo in Ústí nad Labem was founded in 1908 by Heinrich Lumpe, a businessman and dealer in metal goods, and a respected ornithologist and nature lover. Lumpe purchased 6 hectares (15 acres) of land and set up a private bird sanctuary that was known as Lumpepark. On this property, he built the Little Dwarf castle, a system of cascades and waterfalls, and a lake with a fountain in the lower part of the property. In 1914, the park was opened to the public.

After Lumpe's death in 1936, the park was kept up, largely thanks to the senior gardener and other staff. After World War II, the Czech Republic took over the park and turned it into a zoo. The new cages and paddocks were installed, and the area was gradually enlarged to its current 26 hectares (64 acres).

In the 1970s, the zoo started updating their exhibits, with glass replacing bars and more spacious paddocks for the animals.

== Animals ==
The zoo is home to about 1,500 animals of 240 species, many of them under the framework of the European Breeding Programmes.

== Other attractions ==
For children, the zoo includes "Children’s World" (which contains models of animals with slides), the "Children’s ZOO" (a petting zoo with domesticated animals), and "Dinosaur Nature Trail" (with models of prehistoric animals).

In 2007, the zoo opened ZooTrain, a tram that (for a fee) transports visitors from the lower to the upper entrance of the zoo. In 2010, the zoo opened a restaurant in the lower part of the zoo, which is open to zoo visitors but also has a separate entrance for people who only want to come to the restaurant.
