= Canute VI of Denmark =

King of Denmark from 1182 to 1202

Canute VI
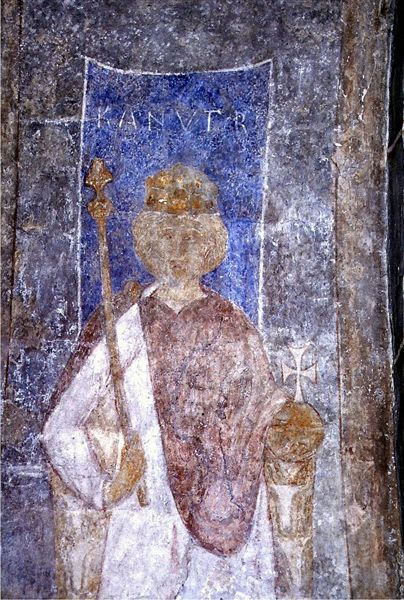
- Contemporary donor portrait of Canute in Stehag Church, Scania

King of Denmark
- Reign: 1182–1202
- Coronation: 25 June 1170
- Predecessor: Valdemar I
- Successor: Valdemar II

King of the Wends
- Reign: 1185–1202
- Successor: Valdemar II
- Born: c. 1163
- Died: 12 November 1202 (aged 38–39)
- Burial: St. Bendt's Church
- Spouse: Gertrude of Bavaria (m. 1177; died 1197)
- House: Estridsen
- Father: Valdemar I of Denmark
- Mother: Sophia of Minsk

Canute VI (Danish: Knud Valdemarsøn; c. 1163 – 12 November 1202) was King of Denmark from 1182 to 1202. Contemporary sources describe Canute as an earnest, strongly religious man.

== Background ==
Canute VI was the eldest son of King Valdemar I and Sophia of Polotsk. His younger brother Valdemar was born in 1170. On 25 June 1170, at age 7, Canute was proclaimed and crowned co-king of Denmark with his father. Canute was crowned in the first coronation in Danish history by Archbishop Eskil of Lund at Ringsted.

== Reign ==
Following his father's death in 1182, Canute became sole ruler and King of Denmark in 1182. at the Urnehoved Assembly (Danish: landsting) and subsequently at the other assemblies throughout Denmark. He immediately faced a peasant uprising in Skåne. The peasants refused to pay Bishop Absalon's tithe. They met at the Skåne Assembly and chose Harald Skreng, one of Canute’s friends to represent them to the king to plead their case. The king refused to hear Skreng out and began to gather an army to teach the peasants their place. Before the king could muster his army, the nobles of Halland and Skåne cobbled together their own army and defeated the peasants in a bloody battle at Dösjebro (Dysjebro) in Skåne. Canute arrived with his army and proceeded to teach the peasants a lesson with fire and sword. Canute was so relentless that Bishop Absalon begged the king to desist. Emperor Frederick Barbarossa had compelled Canute's father to acknowledge him as overlord, and in 1184 Barbarossa sent a messenger to Canute requiring him to acknowledge the emperor as his liege. Canute failed to respond, so the emperor sent a second messenger threatening the emperor's wrath if Canute failed to acknowledge his liege lord. Bishop Absalon replied to the messenger on behalf of Canute. "Canute is as free a king as the emperor. He has as much right to Denmark as the emperor has to the Holy Roman Empire, and so the emperor should expect no allegiance from this place."

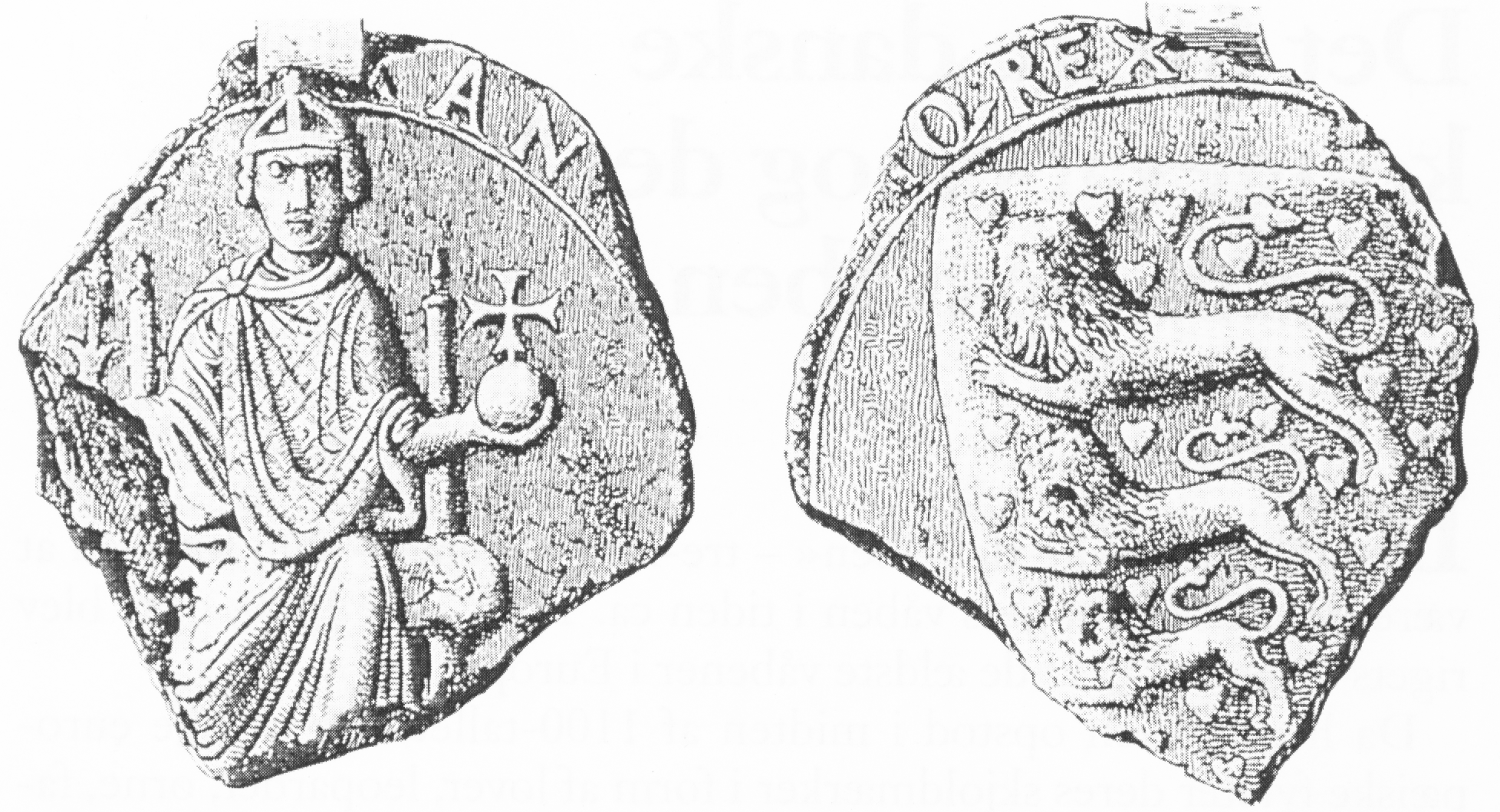
The seal of Canute VI, dating from the 1190s, is the earliest known example of the coat of arms of Denmark. The only known copy of this insignia was discovered in Schwerin, Germany in 1879. The king's closed crown differs from the open crowns shown on the seals of his successors.

The emperor flew into a rage when he received Canute's reply, but because of troubles farther south, ordered his vassal, Bogislaw I of Pomerania to invade Denmark. Duke Bogislaw, recognizing a great opportunity quickly gathered 500 ships. The first notice of the pending invasion came from Jaromar I, Prince of Rügen who sailed to Zealand to give warning. The king was in Jutland, and so it was left to Bishop Absalon to order every available ship from Zealand, Funen and Skåne to meet him in six days. Absalon sailed for Rügen with his fleet and waited for Bugislaw to show up. When the enemy failed to appear, Absalon sent out scouts to bring word when the Pomeranian fleet arrived. He ordered his men to go ashore so he could celebrate mass on Second Easter Day. In the middle of services, one of the scouts ran into the church shouting that the enemy had been sighted through the fog. "Now will I let my sword sing the mass to the praise of God!" exclaimed Absalon as he set aside the altar implements.

The Danish fleet weighed anchor and sailed through the fog toward the Pomeranians. Bugislaw's fleet saw nothing of the Danes until they were close enough to hear their war cries. Fear swept through the Pomeranians, and they tried to row away, but they were in such close quarters that the ships couldn't turn. The men panicked and began jumping from ship to ship which caused eight ships to founder. The Danes threw themselves onto the ships to plunder them when Absalon shouted that they should leave the goods and go after the ships. Few complied and with just seven ships, Absalon routed the entire Pomeranian fleet, capturing 35 enemy ships. Absalon sent Bugislaw's own great tent to Canute, who was still in Jutland. With Bugislaw's defeat the emperor gave up, for a time, his attempt to rule Denmark.

Canute ordered two invasions of Pomerania and in 1185 forced Bogislaw to acknowledge Canute as his overlord. From that time until 1972 the kings of Denmark used the title "King of the Wends" (De Venders Koning) as part of a lengthy list of duchies, counties, and regions ruled by Danish monarchs through the centuries. Canute personally led a crusade against the pagan Estonians in 1197.

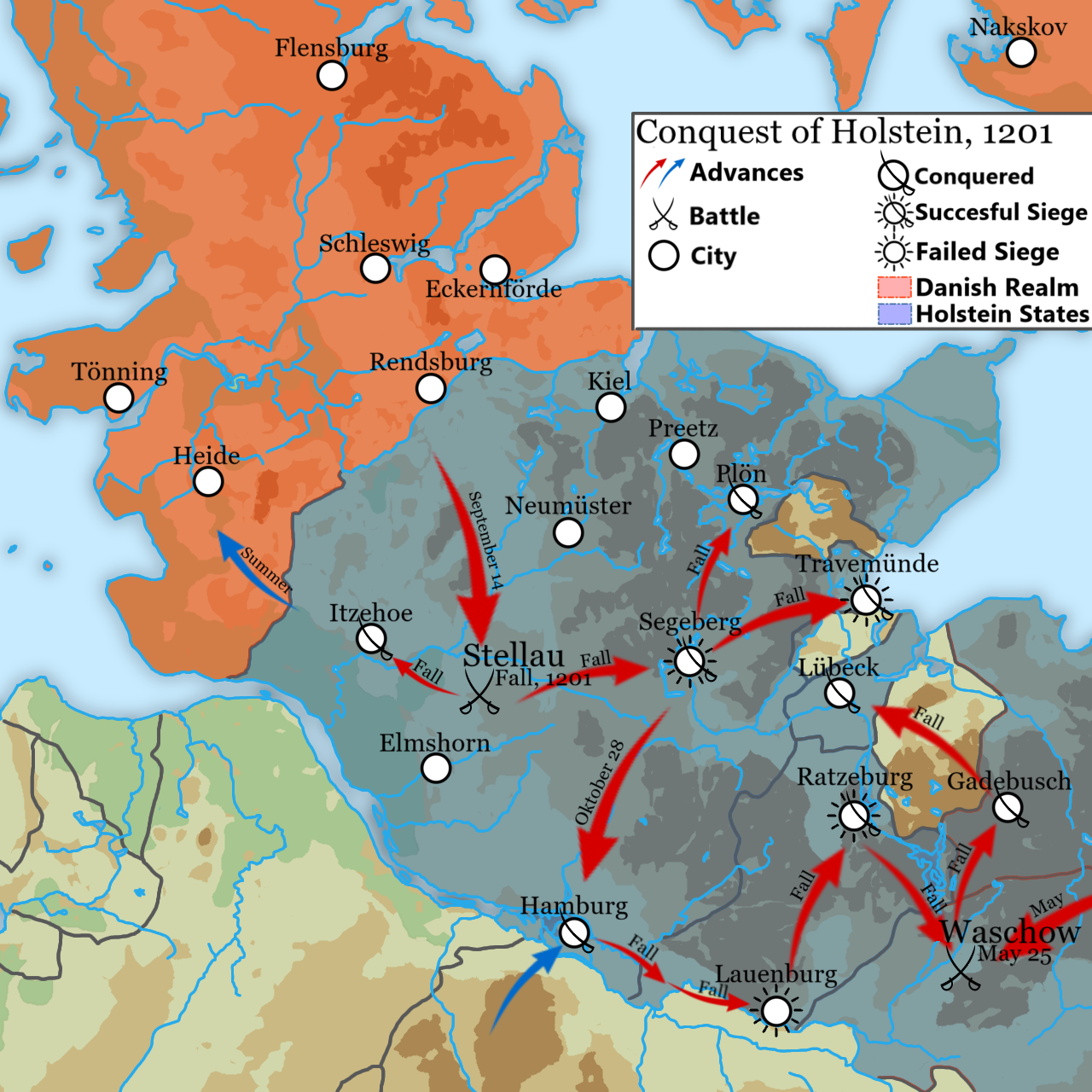
Duke Valdemar's Conquest of Holstein 1201

Canute's younger brother Valdemar, Duke of Southern Jutland, was just twelve years old when his father died and Bishop Valdemar of Schleswig (1158-1236) was appointed regent until Valdemar came of age to rule. Bishop Valdemar was ambitious and began gathering support of German nobles to support him against the king. Disguising his own interests as young Valdemar's, Bishop Valdemar plotted with Count Adolf III of Holstein (1160–1225) to overthrow King Canute and set himself up as king. When Valdemar was selected as Archbishop of Lund, he spoke openly of his plans. Young Duke Valdemar asked to meet with Bishop Valdemar at Åbenrå in 1192. When the powerful bishop arrived, young Valdemar ordered his men to arrest the bishop and sent him in chains to Søborg Tower in North Zealand for the next 13 years. In 1199 Count Adolf tried to raise opposition to Valdemar in southern Denmark, so the young Duke attacked Adolf's new fortress at Rendsburg. Valdemar defeated Adolf's army in the Battle of Stellau in 1201 and captured the count who spent the next three years in Søborg Tower with the archbishop. In order to buy his freedom, the count had to turn over all his lands north of the Elbe to Duke Valdemar in 1203.

== Succession ==
Canute's friend and chief advisor, Bishop Absalon died on 21 March 1201. He had been one of the most important figures in all of Danish history. Under King Canute VI, Absalon was the chief policymaker in Danish politics. Absalon was buried beside his father in Sorø church. His epitaph reads "a good and brave man". Less than two years later on 12 November 1202, Canute died suddenly at age 39.

In 1177, Canute married Gertrude (ca.1155–1197), daughter of Duke Henry the Lion of Saxony. She was first married to Frederick IV, Duke of Swabia in 1166 and had become a widow in 1167. During their marriage, Canute and Gertrude had no children. King Canute was succeeded by his younger brother Valdemar II of Denmark (1170–1241) who ruled from 1202 to 1241.

Canute VI House of Estridsen Born: circa 1163 Died: 12 November 1202
Regnal titles
Preceded by Valdemar I	King of Denmark; 1182–1202	Succeeded by Valdemar II
