= Stehag =

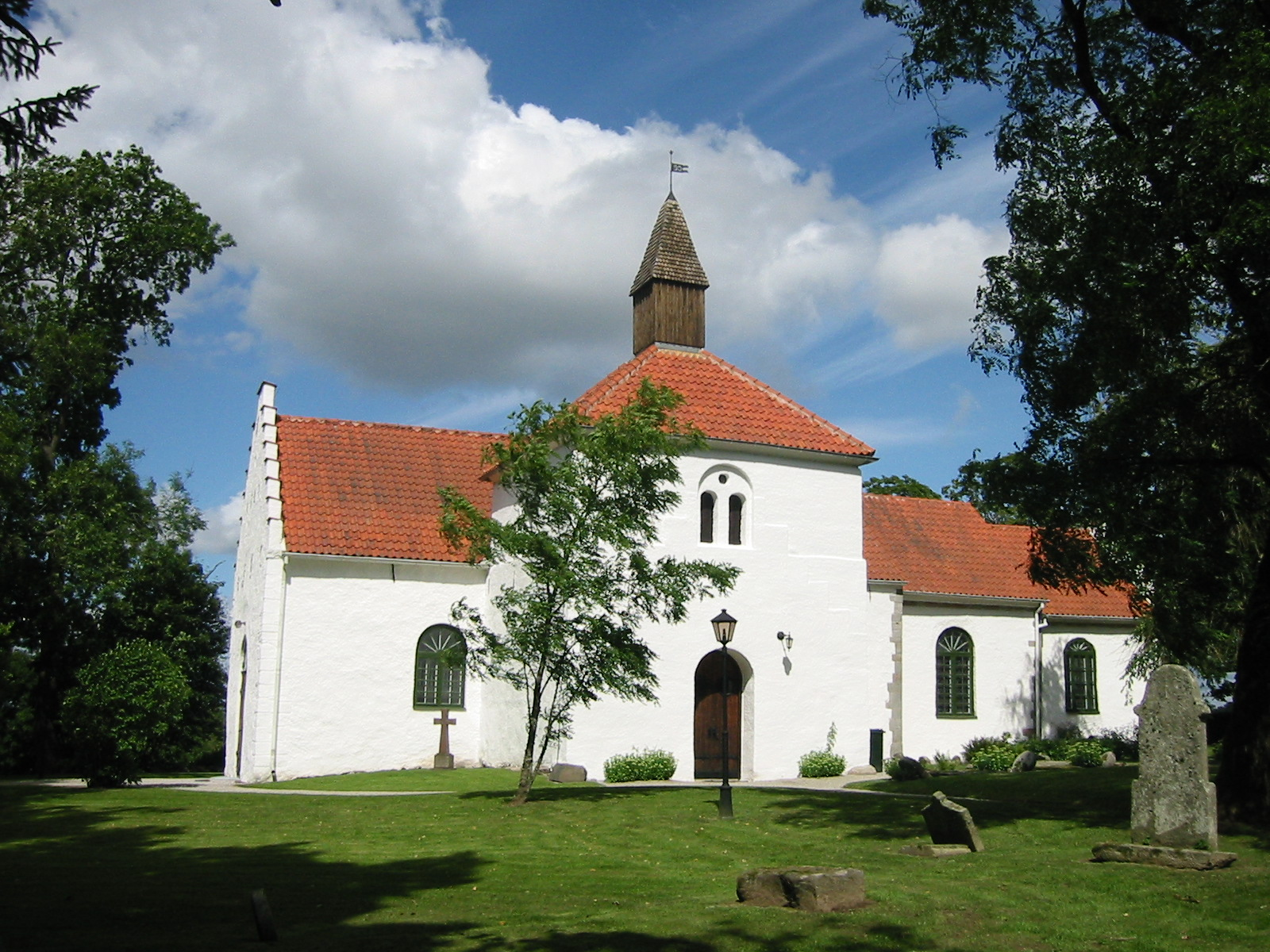
- Stehag Church

- Location within Skåne Location within Sweden
- Coordinates: 55°54′N 13°23′E
- Country: Sweden
- Province: Skåne
- County: Skåne County
- Municipality: Eslöv Municipality

Area
  - Total: 0.86 km^{2} (0.33 sq mi)

Population (31 December 2010)
  - Total: 1,122
  - Density: 1,312/km^{2} (3,400/sq mi)
- Time zone: UTC+1 (CET)
  - Summer (DST): UTC+2 (CEST)

Stehag (Swedish pronunciation: [ˈstêːhɑːɡ]) is a locality situated in Eslöv Municipality, Skåne County, Sweden with 1,261 inhabitants as of 2018. The medieval Stehag Church contains early medieval mural paintings.

The wrestler Karl Erik Nilsson, was born here
