= Heinrich Lumpe =

German-Czech businessman, philanthropist, ornithologist and conservationist

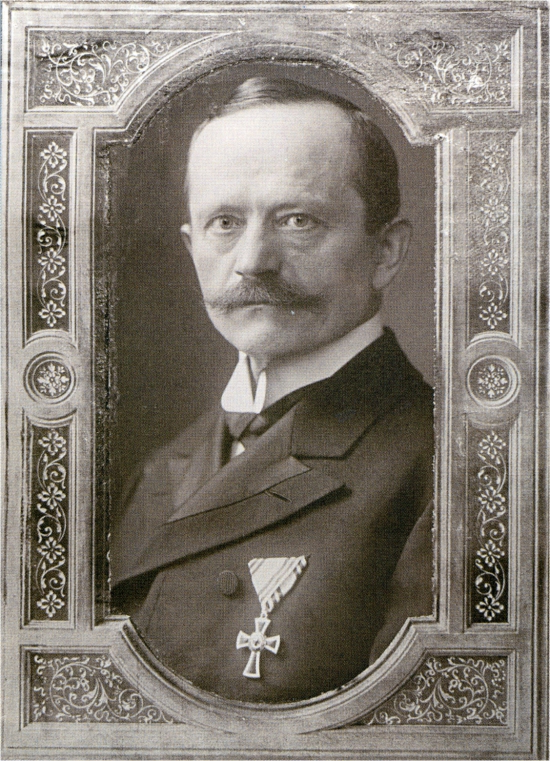

Heinrich Lumpe or Jindřich Lumpe (16 February 1859 – 21 February 1936) was a German-Czech businessman, philanthropist, ornithologist and conservationist. He was involved in the establishment of a private bird reserve in Aussig-Schönpriesen, Marienberg (now Ústí nad Labem) which later became the Ústí nad Labem Zoo.

== Life and work ==
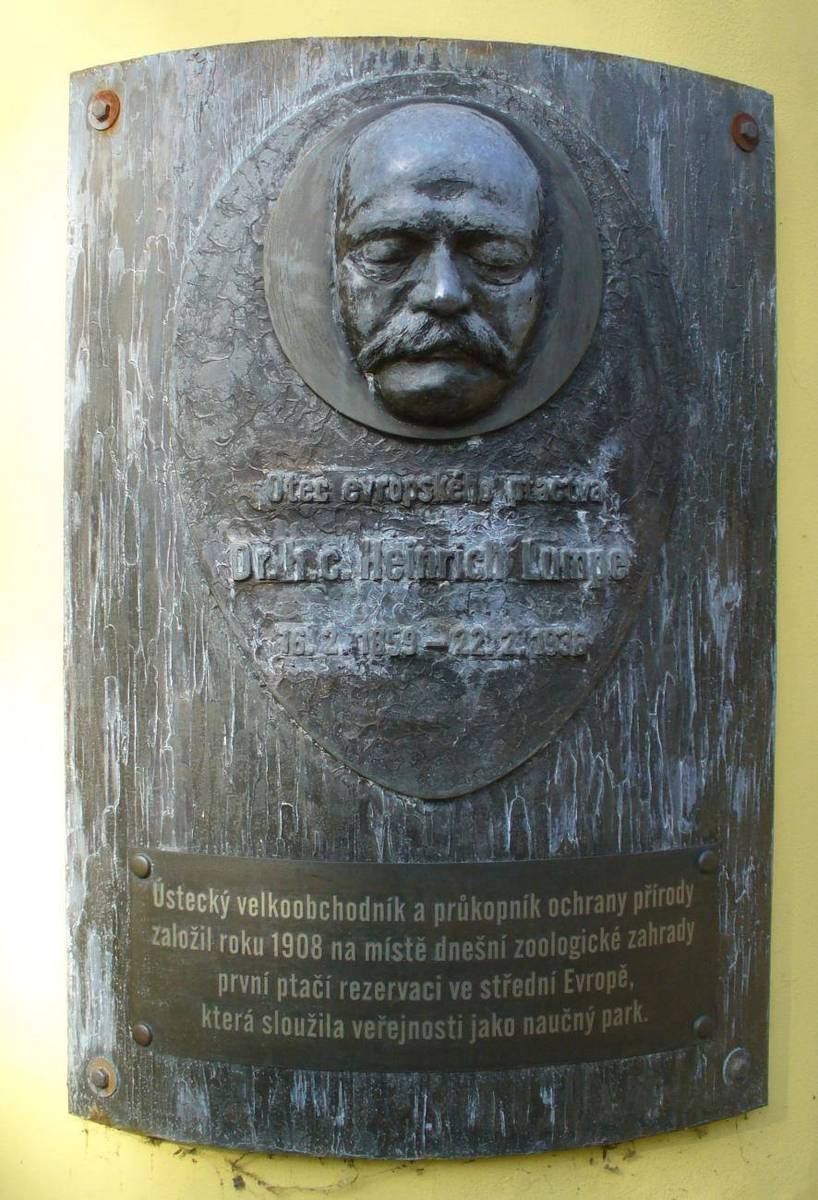
Memorial plaque to Lumpe at the park he established

Lumpe was born in Doubice to farmer and wood merchant Heinrich Ferdinand and his wife Helene née Grohmann. He schooled at Krásná Lípa and apprenticed in a grocery story in Tetschen (Děčín) in 1873 and joined the business of his uncle Ignaz Lumpe in Aussig. He later worked with iron merchant C.P. Heynemann in Halle and still later returned to his uncle's company and took it over in 1895. He worked in the iron trade. A nephew, Alfred, joined his company in 1901. He married Marie (1865–1946) daughter of Julius Lippert in 1894 and in 1908 he purchased a 6 hectare patch of land and established a nature park and bird reserve. Professor Jiří Janda was involved in the selection of the site and he consulted with Josef Kořenský and employed the garden designer Rudolf Jenatský. His wife helped in the venture by planting trees and plants in the park. It was opened to the public in 1914. There were about 81 species of bird and other attractions included a grotto and various statues. He founded a German natural and bird protection association in 1922. He established a fund to support botanical study in the University of Vienna. He received an honorary doctorate from the University of Greifswald. He was also involved in water management and established a waterworks company in 1908 which was closed in 1916 following bankruptcy. In 1936 he visited a spa in Tereziná lázně in Dubí and he was found dead in a frozen pond. In 1949 the area was converted into a zoological garden.

A plant species Carum lumpeanum was named after him but it is now considered a synonym for Hellenocarum strictum.
