= Chřibská =

- Town
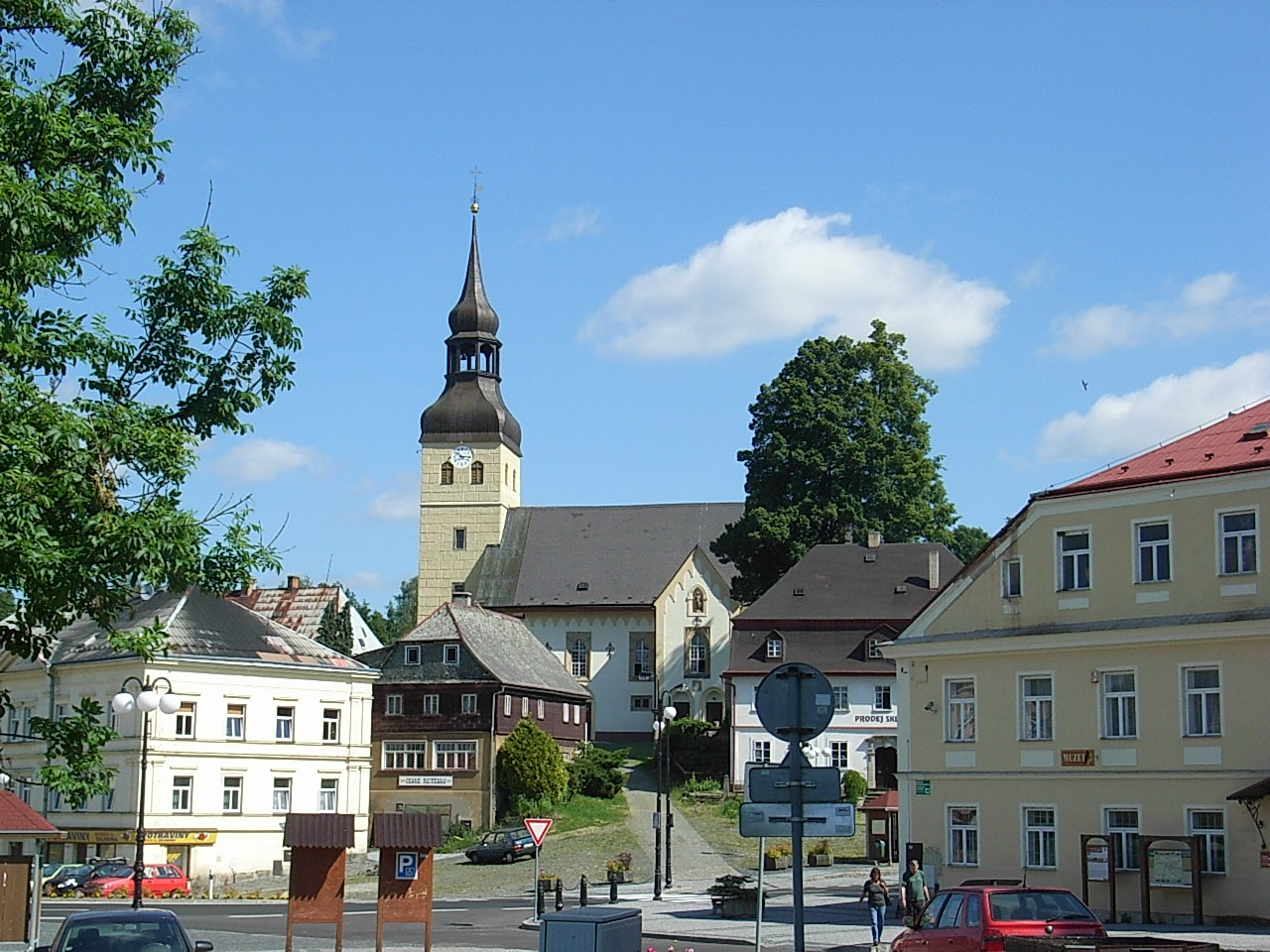
- Square with Church of Saint George and birth house of Thaddäus Haenke (far right)

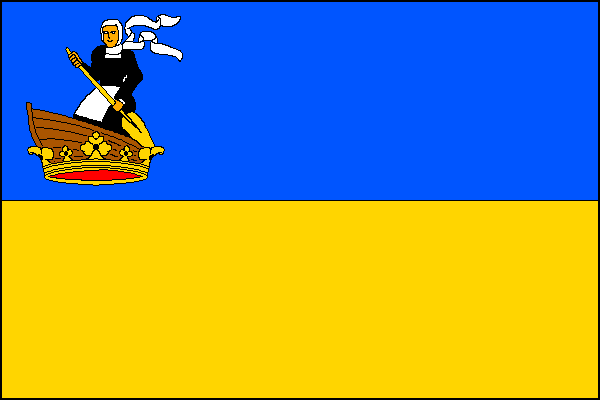
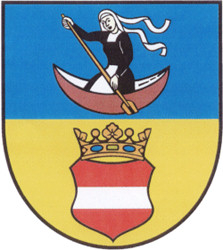
- Flag Coat of arms

- Location in the Czech Republic
- Coordinates: 50°51′48″N 14°28′59″E
- Country: Czech Republic
- Region: Ústí nad Labem
- District: Děčín
- First mentioned: 1352

Government
  - Mayor: Jan Machač

Area
  - Total: 15.93 km^{2} (6.15 sq mi)
- Elevation: 387 m (1,270 ft)

Population (2026-01-01)
  - Total: 1,316
  - Density: 82.61/km^{2} (214.0/sq mi)
- Time zone: UTC+1 (CET)
  - Summer (DST): UTC+2 (CEST)
- Postal code: 407 44
- Website: www.mesto-chribska.cz

Chřibská (Czech pronunciation: [ˈxr̝̊ɪpskaː]; German: Kreibitz) is a town in Děčín District in the Ústí nad Labem Region of the Czech Republic. It has about 1,300 inhabitants. The town is located on the Chřibská Kamenice River, on the border between the Lusatian Mountains and Elbe Sandstone Mountains. The main landmark of Chřibská is the Church of Saint George.

== Administrative division ==
Chřibská consists of four municipal parts (in brackets population according to the 2021 census):

- Chřibská (620)
- Dolní Chřibská (382)
- Horní Chřibská (210)
- Krásné Pole (141)

== Etymology ==
The initial name of Chřibská was Křípčice (in Old Czech written as Křiepčice). The name has probably its origin in the personal name Chřáp. From 1363, the forms Křípská and Křiepská began to appear, from which the current name later evolved.

== Geography ==
Chřibská is located about 21 kilometres (13 mi) northeast of Děčín and 38 km (24 mi) northeast of Ústí nad Labem. Most of the municipal territory lies in the Lusatian Mountains and in the eponymous protected landscape area. The western part of the territory extends into the Elbe Sandstone Mountains and a small part of Chřibská also lies in the Bohemian Switzerland National Park. The highest point is the hill Spravedlnost at 533 m (1,749 ft) above sea level. The Chřibská Kamenice River flows through the town.

== History ==
The first written mention of Chřibská is from 1352. It was part of the Kamenice estate, owned by the Wartenberg family until 1614, when it was bought by the Kinsky family. Town rights were granted in 1570.

Along with other parts of the former Austrian Empire, Chřibská became part of Czechoslovakia in 1919. From 1938 to 1945, after the Munich Agreement, Chřibská was annexed by Nazi Germany and administered as part of the Reichsgau Sudetenland. The expulsion of Germans after World War II in 1945–1946 reduced the population.

In 2006, the town status was returned to Chřibská.

== Demographics ==
Historical population

Year	Pop.	±%
1869	5,777	—
1880	5,650	−2.2%
1890	5,205	−7.9%
1900	5,095	−2.1%
1910	5,121	+0.5%

Year	Pop.	±%
1921	4,463	−12.8%
1930	4,788	+7.3%
1950	1,864	−61.1%
1961	1,673	−10.2%
1970	1,660	−0.8%

Year	Pop.	±%
1980	1,610	−3.0%
1991	1,411	−12.4%
2001	1,429	+1.3%
2011	1,381	−3.4%
2021	1,353	−2.0%

Source: Censuses

== Economy ==
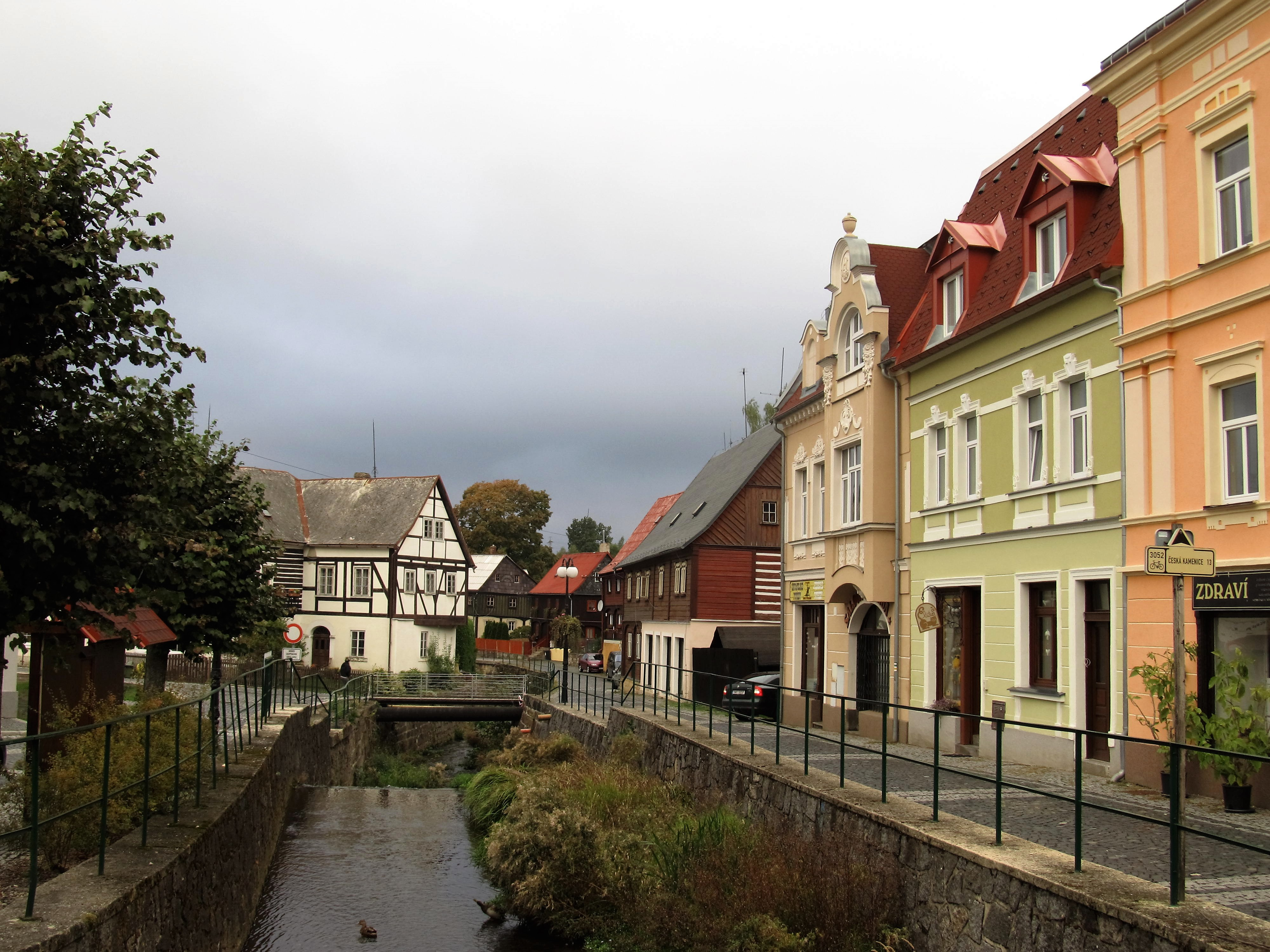
Waterfront of the Chřibská Kamenice

The oldest running glass production in Europe is located in Horní Chřibská. It was founded shortly after 1500 by the German-Bohemian glass-maker family Friedrich.

== Transport ==
The train station Chřibská on the railway line Děčín–Rumburk, which serves the town, is located east of the town in the territory in neighbouring Rybniště.

== Sights ==
The main landmark of Chřibská is the Church of Saint George. The original Gothic church was rebuilt in the Renaissance style in 1596. Later it was modified in the Gothic style again, and two Baroque chapels were added.

== Notable people ==
- Thaddäus Haenke (1761–1816), botanist and explorer
