= Mass bequest =

A bequest for a Mass occurs when a person leaves a bequest in their will for a Mass to be said for the repose of their soul.

== Legal status ==
In England after the Reformation such bequests were deemed to be invalid in law as "superstitious" until 1919, when the House of Lords held them to be valid.

In Ireland a judgment of the Court of Chancery in 1823 found that in that country such bequests had always been legally valid.
