= Coyet =

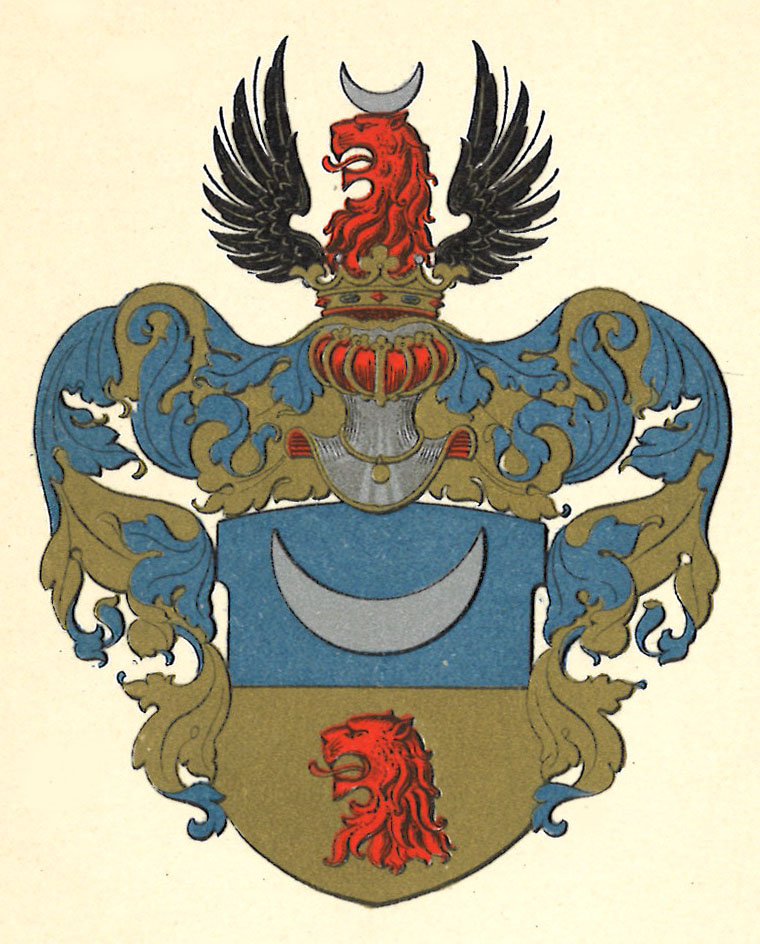
Coat of arms of the Swedish noble family Coyet.

Coyet is a Dutch-Swedish noble family. Notable members of the family include:

- Balthasar Coyett, Dutch-Swedish colonial official
- Frederick Coyett, Swedish nobleman
- Vilhelmina Eleonora Coyet, wife of Rutger Macklean, 2nd Friherre
