= Doubice =

- Municipality
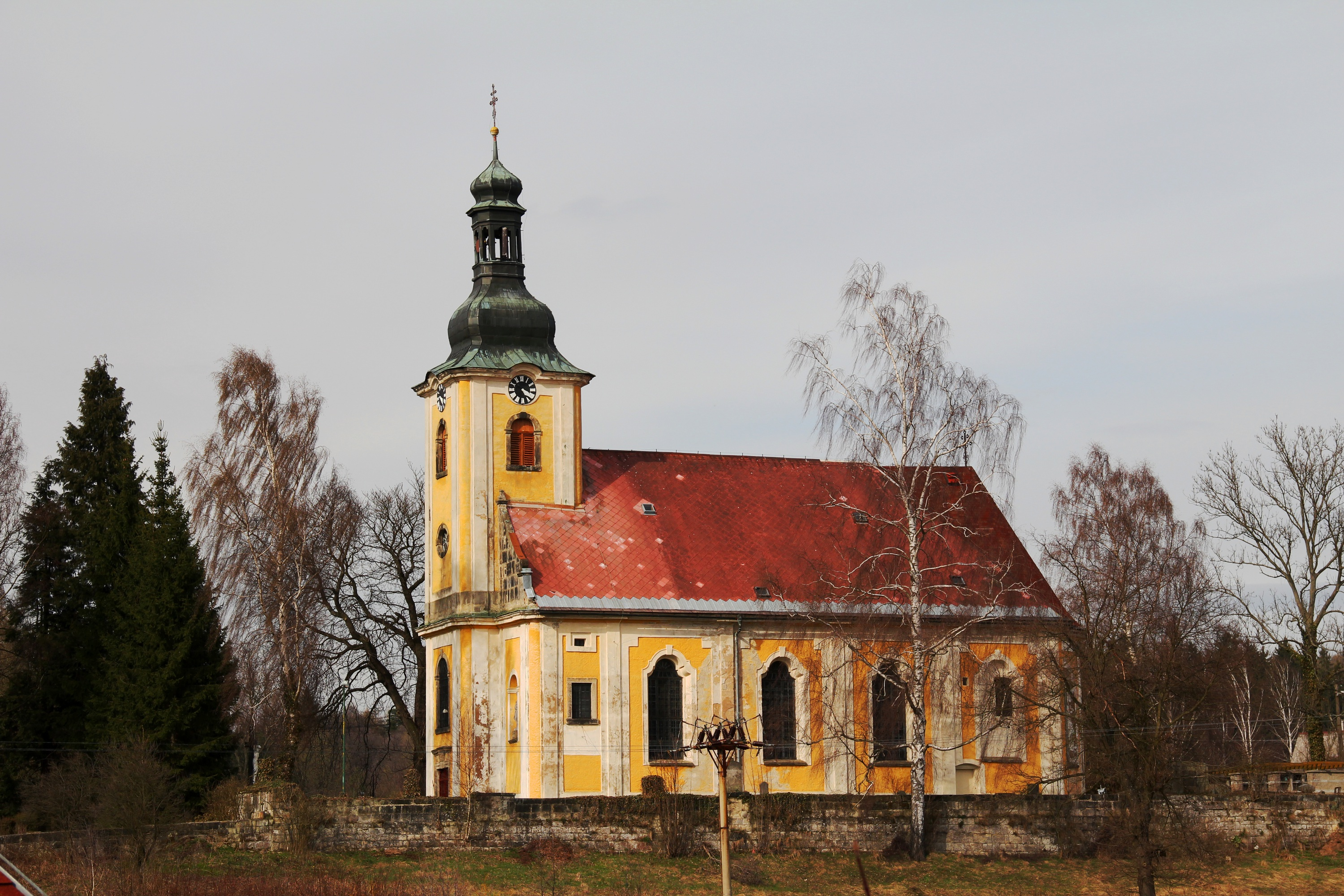
- Church of the Assumption of the Virgin Mary

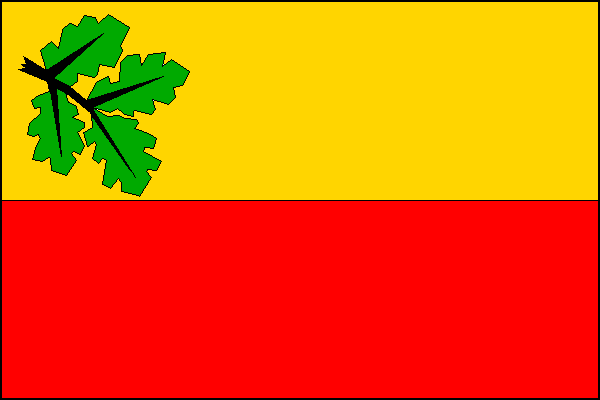
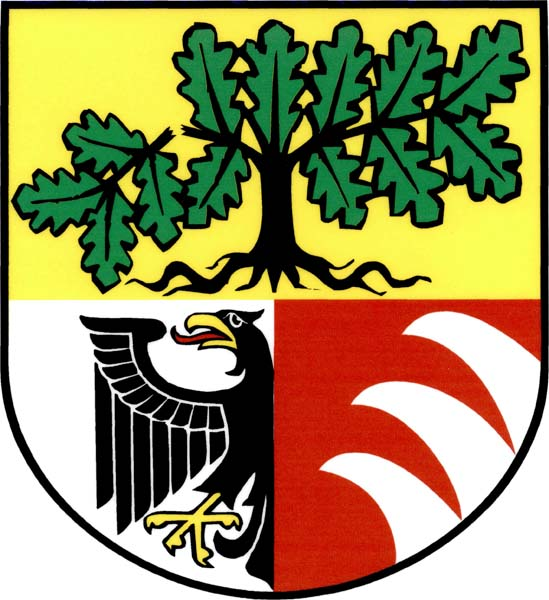
- Flag Coat of arms

- Location in the Czech Republic
- Coordinates: 50°53′19″N 14°27′42″E
- Country: Czech Republic
- Region: Ústí nad Labem
- District: Děčín
- First mentioned: 1457

Area
  - Total: 19.28 km^{2} (7.44 sq mi)
- Elevation: 392 m (1,286 ft)

Population (2026-01-01)
  - Total: 102
  - Density: 5.29/km^{2} (13.7/sq mi)
- Time zone: UTC+1 (CET)
  - Summer (DST): UTC+2 (CEST)
- Postal code: 407 47
- Website: oudoubice.cz

Doubice (German: Daubitz) is a municipality and village in Děčín District in the Ústí nad Labem Region of the Czech Republic. It has about 100 inhabitants.

Doubice lies approximately 23 kilometres (14 mi) north-east of Děčín, 39 km (24 mi) north-east of Ústí nad Labem, and 89 km (55 mi) north of Prague.

== Demographics ==
Historical population
Year	Pop.	±%
1869	1,293	—
1880	1,174	−9.2%
1890	1,054	−10.2%
1900	903	−14.3%
1910	877	−2.9%
1921	759	−13.5%
1930	846	+11.5%
1950	282	−66.7%
1961	221	−21.6%
1970	107	−51.6%
1980	73	−31.8%
1991	53	−27.4%
2001	80	+50.9%
2011	122	+52.5%
2021	114	−6.6%
Source: Censuses

== Notable people ==
- Heinrich Lumpe (1859–1936), German-Czech businessman and philanthropist
