= Lau, Gotland =

District of the island of Gotland, Sweden

Lau
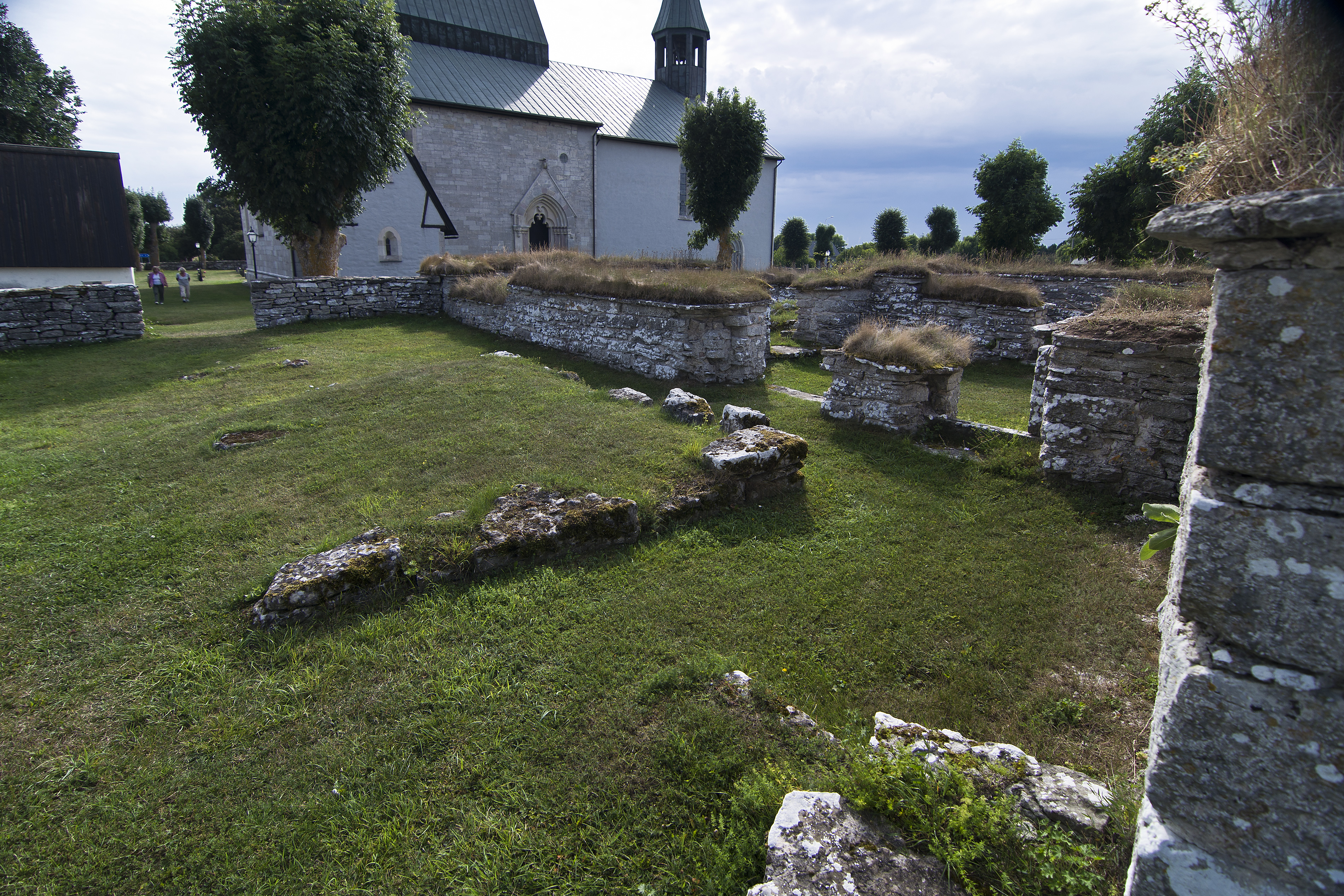
- The Castal adjacent Lau Church

- Location within Gotland
- Coordinates: 57°16′58″N 18°37′13″E
- Country: Sweden
- Province: Gotland
- County: Gotland County
- Municipality: Gotland Municipality

Area
  - Total: 28 km^{2} (11 sq mi)

Population (2014)
  - Total: 227
- Time zone: UTC+1 (CET)
  - Summer (DST): UTC+2 (CEST)
- Website: www.lau.se

Lau is a socken on the Swedish island of Gotland. It comprises the same area as the administrative Lau District, established on 1 January 2016. Originally an island, it is now part of the main Gotland island due to the isostasy. It is mostly known for the good water from the spring Lau Käldu.

== Geography ==
Lau is the name of the socken as well as the district. It is also the name of the small village surrounding the medieval Lau Church, sometimes referred to as Lau kyrkby. It is situated south of Ljugarn on the east coast of Gotland, at Lau Cove (Lauviken). The area is rural with farms and a forest by the coast.

As of 2019, Lau Church belongs to När-Lau parish in Burs pastorat, along with the church in När.

One of the asteroids in the asteroid belt, 10811 Lau, is named after this place.

=== Lau Islets ===
Off the coast of Lau are three islands, known as the Laus Holmar (the Lau Islets). Despite their name, they belong to the neighboring Alskog socken and not to Lau. Their names are Skarpholmen, Gräsholmen and Storholmen. The two first ones are owned by the Swedish government, and have been designated as bird reserves. The last one, Storholmen, is divided into allotments belonging to farms in Lau and Alskog. It is mainly used for grazing sheep. The lighthouse on Storholmen is called Storholms-Annika. When the Swedish Maritime Administration wanted to decommission it, the lighthouse was bought by the Lau Heritage Society since it was deemed vital for local pleasure crafts and fishermen. It is built on the foundation of an old sea mark and is solar-powered.

=== Lau Spring ===
The spring at Lau Hills, the Lau Käldu, has become a symbol for the socken. The spring is the most prominent of several sources emerging from the water-rich limestone and gravel hills of Lau. The spring was originally just some rivulets forming a brook. Later on the water was led through wood lined channels to a wooden trough. In 1918, the channels were replaced with iron pipes and a well house with a small fountain was built. A pond for watering livestock was also added. As of 2015, people from all of Gotland still come to fetch the renowned water from the spring.

On the east side of the Lau Hills, beside Lau Käldu and facing the sea is a small cave called the Godung Cave. Even though the cave is called a Stone Age cave, it is unlikely that it has ever been inhabited.

== Etymology ==
The name Lau, in 1318 Law, means a "low meadow" or "meadow by water".

== History ==
Lau dates back to Medieval times. It was originally part of the Burs thing, which in turn was in the southernmost of the three original districts (similar to ridings) that Gotland was divided into during the Middle Ages. In 1862, Lau became an independent municipality. In 1952, it was incorporated with Ljugarn municipality until all of Gotland became one municipality in 1971. The boatswains from Lau under the allotment system, were part of the Second Gotlandic Boatswains Company.

=== Isostasy ===
During the Stone Age, Lau was an oblong island where the inhabitants lived on the inside of the island's small points. A strait separated the Lau Island from the rest of Gotland. During the Bronze Age the isostasy elevated the land enough for a sand bank to form in the strait. The area became more populated and people settled down on the side of the island facing Gotland and along the bank.

The cross roads, where the road from the island met with the road along the coast, became a hub for the Lau socken. The area was high with a good view of the surrounding area, dry but with plenty of fresh water. This is where the first buildings in Lau for worship and assembly were built. The place is just west of the present-day graveyard. It is called Stavgard, a common name for places on Gotland where meetings were held during pre-Christian time.

The distribution of the farms in Lau was established during the Iron Age and has remained almost the same since then. During that time a hillfort, the remains of which can still be seen, was built at Botvidebackar on the northern tip of Lausbackars. It was protected on three sides by the steep slopes of the hill and on the fourth side was a dug moat with a bridge. During the 1890s, several of the smaller farms and fields were merged into larger units due to new land reforms.

=== Archeological finds and sites ===
There are grave mounds and stone ships from the Bronze Age in Lau. From the Iron Age, there are seven grave fields, house foundations, collapsed stone walls and groove stones. Two of the stone ships and a round grave are situated at Bandeläins täppu on the edge of Lausbackar. They are dated from about 900 BC. 100 m (330 ft) south of the stone ships is a standing stone.

Just north of Lau Church are the ruins from a "castal", or a defense tower. The tower was built during the 12th century, further additions to it were made during the 13th and 14th century and it is assumed that it was converted into a clergy house.
