= Garde, Gotland =

Garde Garda
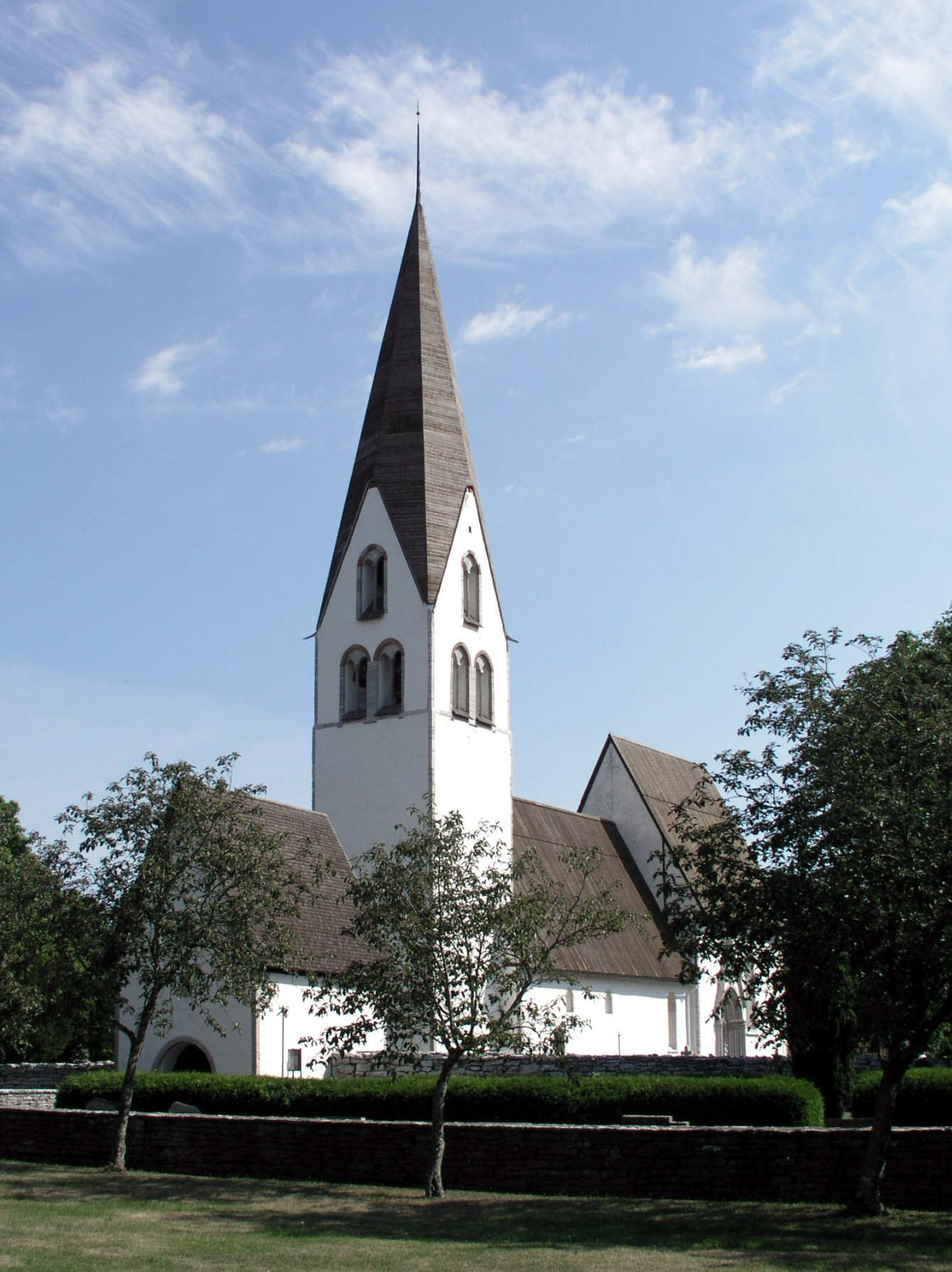
- Garde Church

- Location within Gotland
- Coordinates: 57°19′1″N 18°34′55″E
- Country: Sweden
- Province: Gotland
- County: Gotland County
- Municipality: Gotland Municipality

Area
  - Total: 28.91 km^{2} (11.16 sq mi)

Population (2014)
  - Total: 182
- Time zone: UTC+1 (CET)
  - Summer (DST): UTC+2 (CEST)

Garde (Swedish pronunciation: [ˈɡɑ̂ːɖɛ]) or Garda is a populated area, a socken (not to be confused with parish), on the Swedish island of Gotland. It comprises the same area as the administrative Garde District, established on 1 January 2016. It was the birthplace of the marine biologist Adolf Appellöf (1857).

== Geography ==
Garde is the name of the socken as well as the district. It is also the name of the small village surrounding the medieval Garde Church, sometimes referred to as Garde kyrkby. It is situated in the eastern part of Gotland.

One of the largest cairns on Gotland, the Digerrojr (not to be confused with the eponymous cairn in Alskog) or Graips rojr, is in Garda. It is approximately 5 m (16 ft) high and 35 m (115 ft) in diameter. It is surrounded by standing stones and a rock that is thought to have been used for some kind of sacrifices.

As of 2019, Garde Church belongs to Garde parish, along with the churches in Etelhem, Alskog, Lye and Ardre.

One of the asteroids in the asteroid belt, 10808 Digerrojr, is named after the Digerrojr cairn in Garde.
