= Väte =

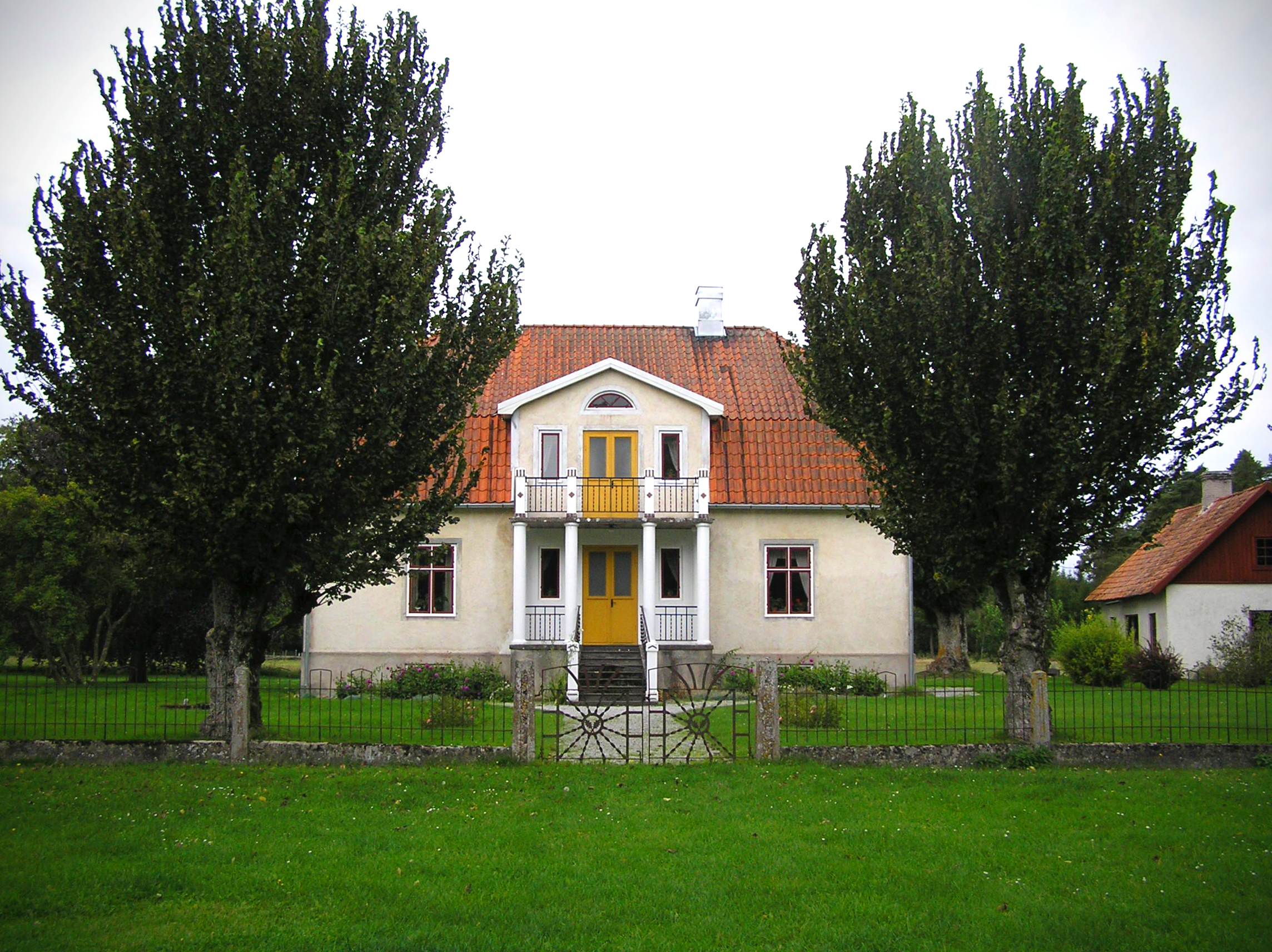
- Norrbys museum farm in Väte

- Location within Gotland
- Coordinates: 57°26′56″N 18°21′50″E
- Country: Sweden
- Province: Gotland
- County: Gotland County
- Municipality: Gotland Municipality

Area
  - Total: 33.93 km^{2} (13.10 sq mi)

Population (2014)
  - Total: 339
- Time zone: UTC+1 (CET)
  - Summer (DST): UTC+2 (CEST)

Väte is a populated area, a socken (not to be confused with parish), on the Swedish island of Gotland. It comprises the same area as the administrative Väte District, established on 1 January 2016.

The Norrbys museum farm in Väte is the only Cultural Reserve on Gotland. It is run and maintained by Gotland Museum. The farm is kept in the same way as it was in the 1930s.

== Geography ==
Väte is situated in the central part of Gotland. The medieval Väte Church is located in the socken. As of 2019, Väte Church belongs to Väte parish in Klinte pastorat.

One of the asteroids in the asteroid belt, 12312 Väte, is named after this place.
