= Etelhem =

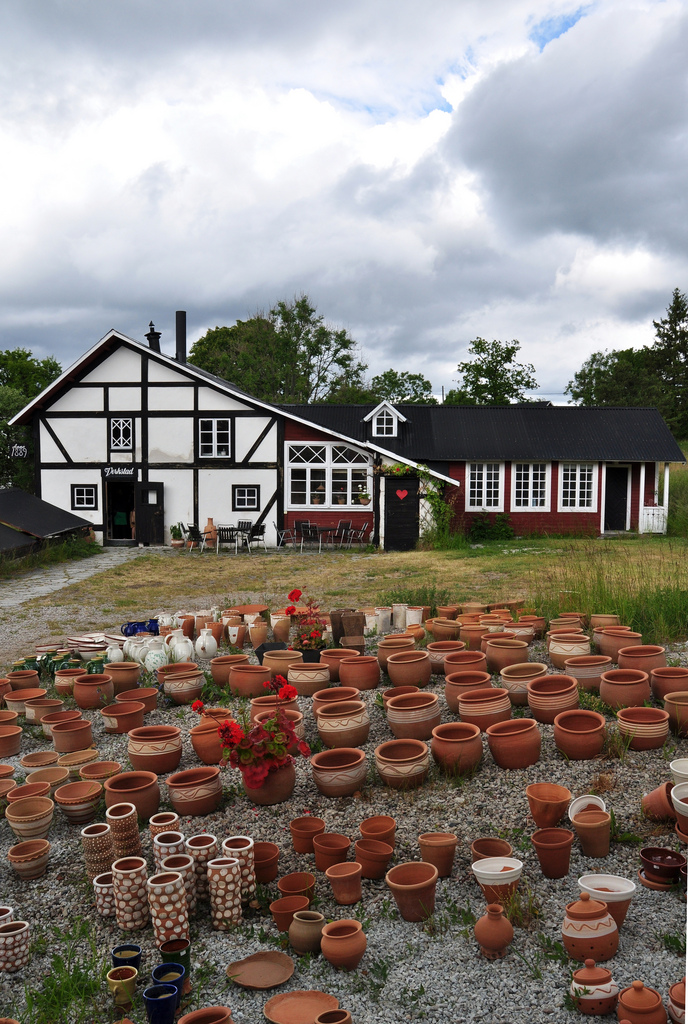
- Etelhem pottery

- Location within Gotland
- Coordinates: 57°20′14″N 18°29′45″E
- Country: Sweden
- Province: Gotland
- County: Gotland County
- Municipality: Gotland Municipality

Area
  - Total: 46.61 km^{2} (18.00 sq mi)

Population (2014)
  - Total: 289
- Time zone: UTC+1 (CET)
  - Summer (DST): UTC+2 (CEST)

Etelhem is a populated area, a socken (not to be confused with parish), on the Swedish island of Gotland. It comprises the same area as the administrative Etelhem District, established on 1 January 2016.

== Geography ==
Etelhem is the name of the socken as well as the district. It is also the name of the small village surrounding the medieval Etelhem Church, sometimes referred to as Etelhems kyrkby. It is situated in the central part of Gotland.

As of 2019, Etelhem Church belongs to Garde parish, along with the churches in Garde, Alskog, Lye and Ardre.

== History ==
Founded and built in 1889, the pottery in Etelhem is the oldest pottery still in use on Gotland. On 31 August 2001, it was designated as a listed building.
