= Hörsne-Bara =

Hörsne-Bara Hörsne
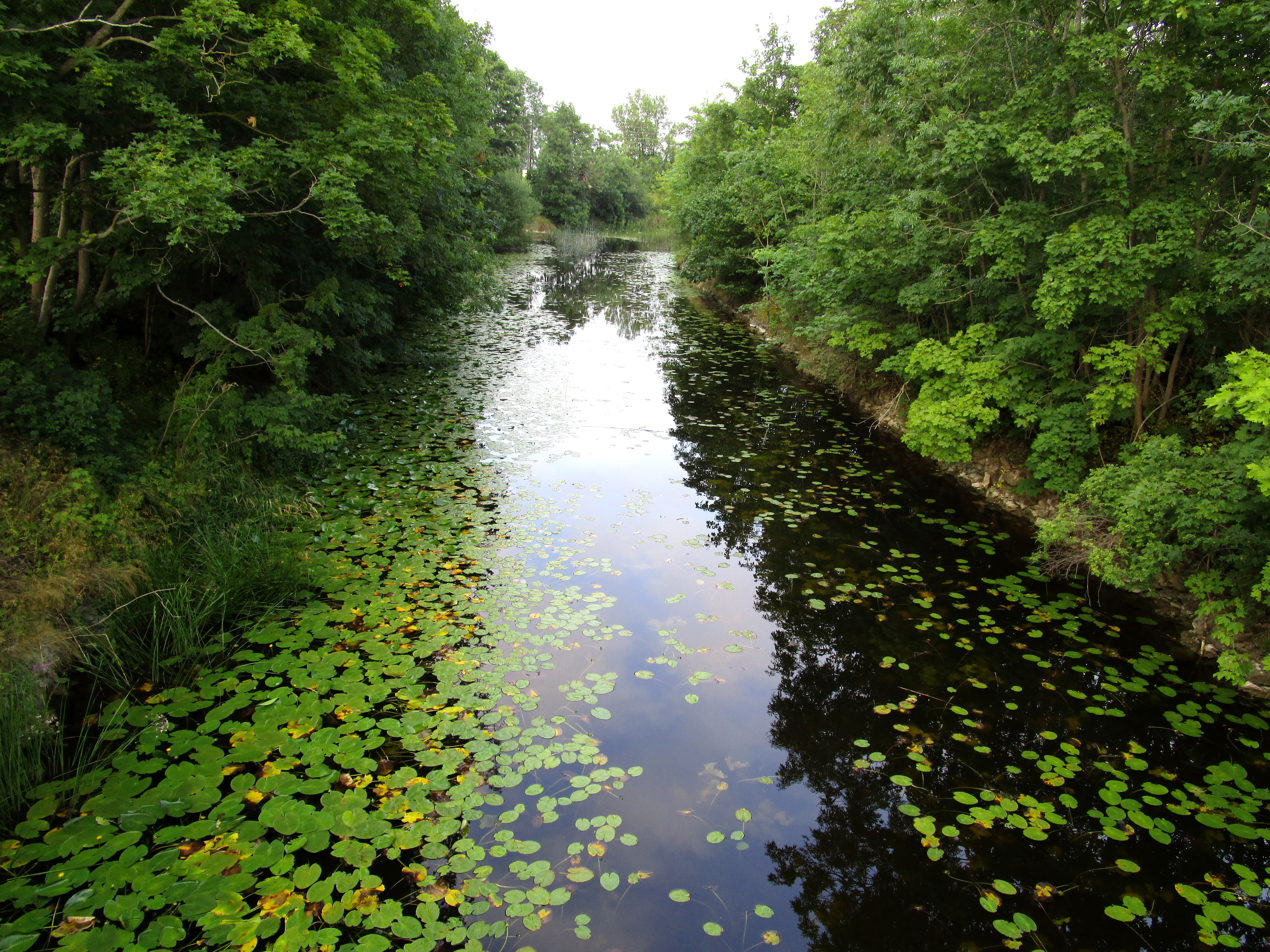
- Hörsne stream

- Location within Gotland
- Coordinates: 57°33′30″N 18°35′50″E
- Country: Sweden
- Province: Gotland
- County: Gotland County
- Municipality: Gotland Municipality

Area
  - Total: 36.16 km^{2} (13.96 sq mi)

Population (2014)
  - Total: 276
- Time zone: UTC+1 (CET)
  - Summer (DST): UTC+2 (CEST)

Hörsne-Bara is a populated area, a socken (not to be confused with parish), on the Swedish island of Gotland. Formerly two sockens, Hörsne (IPA: [ˈhœ̂ʂːnɛ]) and Bara, Bara was merged with Hörsne under the name Hörsne socken or Hörsne with Bara socken. It comprises the same area as the administrative Hörsne-Bara District, established on 1 January 2016.

== Geography ==
Hörsne, or Hörsne with Bara, is the name of the socken as well as the district. Hörsne is also the name of the small village surrounding the medieval Hörsne Church, sometimes referred to as Hörsne kyrkby. It is situated in the central part of Gotland.

At the merging of the sockens and parishes, Hörsne Church was kept, while Bara Church was abandoned. It is now ruined and known as Bara ödekyrka ("Bara Church ruin"), although the grave yard is still in use. Situated by a hill, Baraberget, next to location of a former sacrificial site, it is now a popular place for picnics.

As of 2019, Hörsne Church belongs to Dalhem parish in Romaklosters pastorat, along with the churches in Dalhem, Ganthem and Ekeby.

One of the asteroids in the asteroid belt, 10544 Hörsnebara, is named after this place.
