= Gothem =

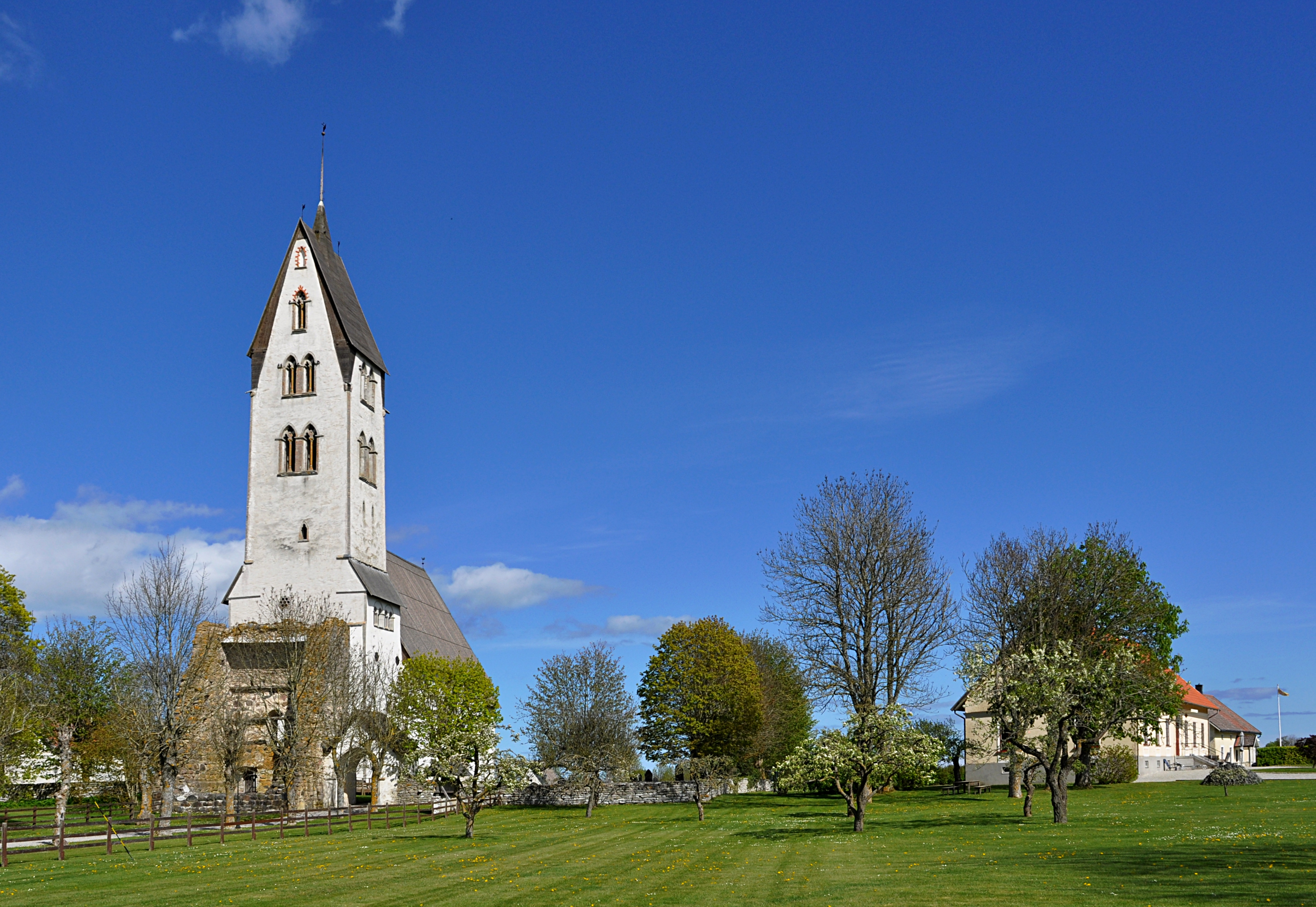
- Gothem Church

- Location within Gotland
- Coordinates: 57°34′31″N 18°44′6″E
- Country: Sweden
- Province: Gotland
- County: Gotland County
- Municipality: Gotland Municipality

Area
  - Total: 71.79 km^{2} (27.72 sq mi)

Population (2014)
  - Total: 381
- Time zone: UTC+1 (CET)
  - Summer (DST): UTC+2 (CEST)
- Website: www.gothem.se

Gothem (Swedish pronunciation: [ˈɡûːthɛm]) is a populated area, a socken (not to be confused with parish), on the Swedish island of Gotland. It comprises the same area as the administrative Gothem District, established on 1 January 2016.

== Geography ==
Gothem is the name of the socken as well as the district. It is also the name given to the small settlement close to the church in the socken, although that name is purely administrative and does not appear on maps. It is situated on the east coast of Gotland. One of Gotland's major streams, Gothemsån, has its outflow at Åminne in Gothem.

The medieval Gothem Church is located in the socken. As of 2019, Gothem Church belongs to Gothem parish in Norra Gotlands pastorat, along with the churches in Norrlanda, Källunge and Vallstena.

One of the asteroids in the asteroid belt, 10809 Majsterrojr, is named after the Majsterrojr cairn in Gothem.

== History ==
One of the largest Bronze Age cairns on Gotland, the Majsterrojr, is in Gothem. It is approximately 4 m (13 ft) high and 33 m (108 ft) in diameter and is surrounded by Bronze Age graves. It is situated on a small hill with stacks, that have also been used as building material for the cairn and the graves.
