= Fröjel =

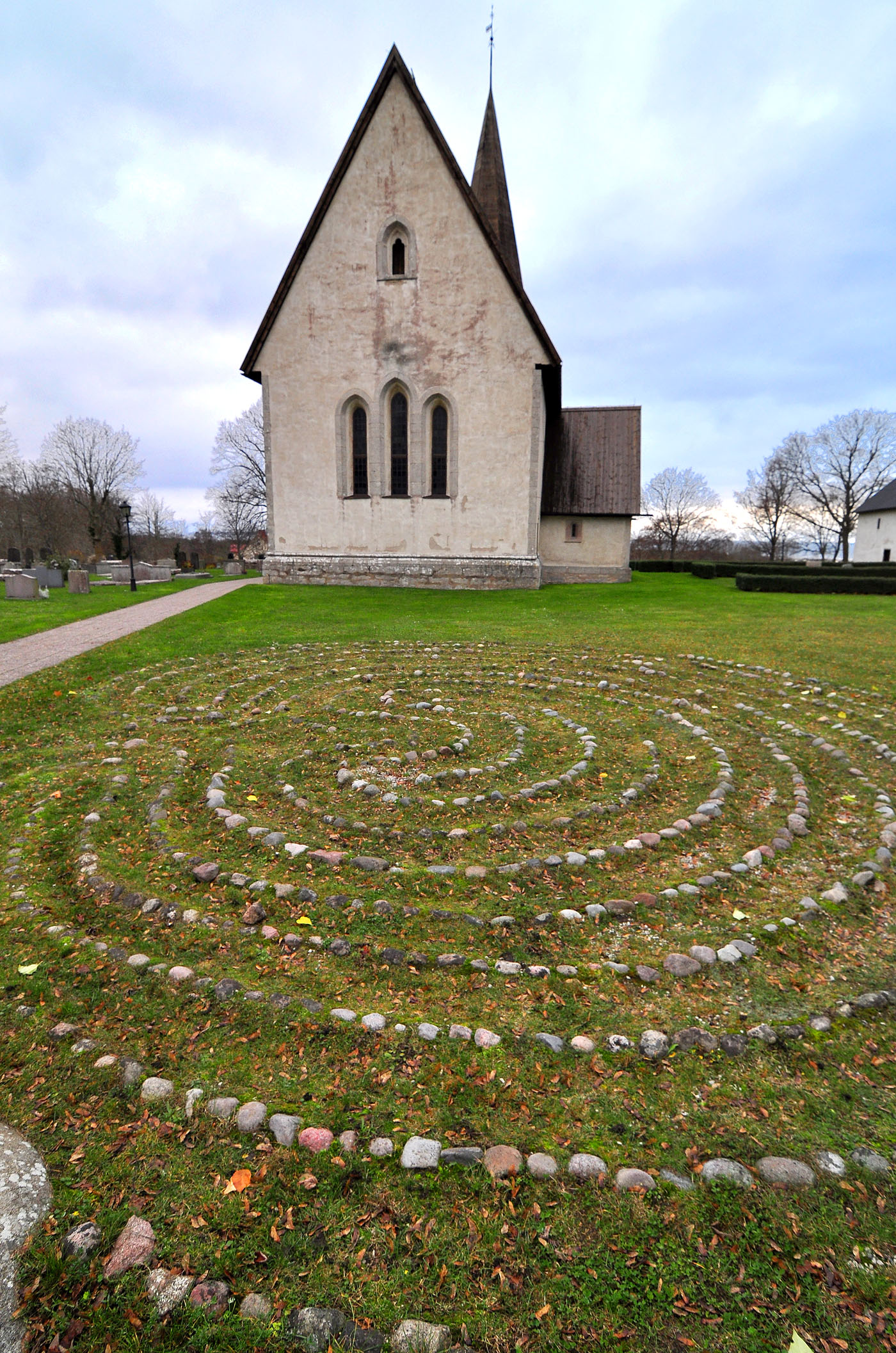
- Stone labyrinth at Fröjel Church

- Location within Gotland
- Coordinates: 57°20′8″N 18°11′23″E
- Country: Sweden
- Province: Gotland
- County: Gotland County
- Municipality: Gotland Municipality

Population (2014)
  - Total: 358
  - Density: 43/km^{2} (110/sq mi)
- Time zone: UTC+1 (CET)
  - Summer (DST): UTC+2 (CEST)

Fröjel (Swedish pronunciation: [ˈfrœ̂jːɛl]) is a populated area, a socken (not to be confused with parish), on the Swedish island of Gotland. It comprises the same area as the administrative Fröjel District, established on 1 January 2016. In 2014, it had a population of 358.

== Geography ==
Fröjel is situated on the west coast of Gotland. The medieval Fröjel Church is in Fröjel. As of 2019, Fröjel Church belongs to Fröjel parish in Klinte pastorat.

One of the asteroids in the main belt, 10127 Fröjel, is named after this place.

== See also ==
- Fröjel Formation
