= Källunge =

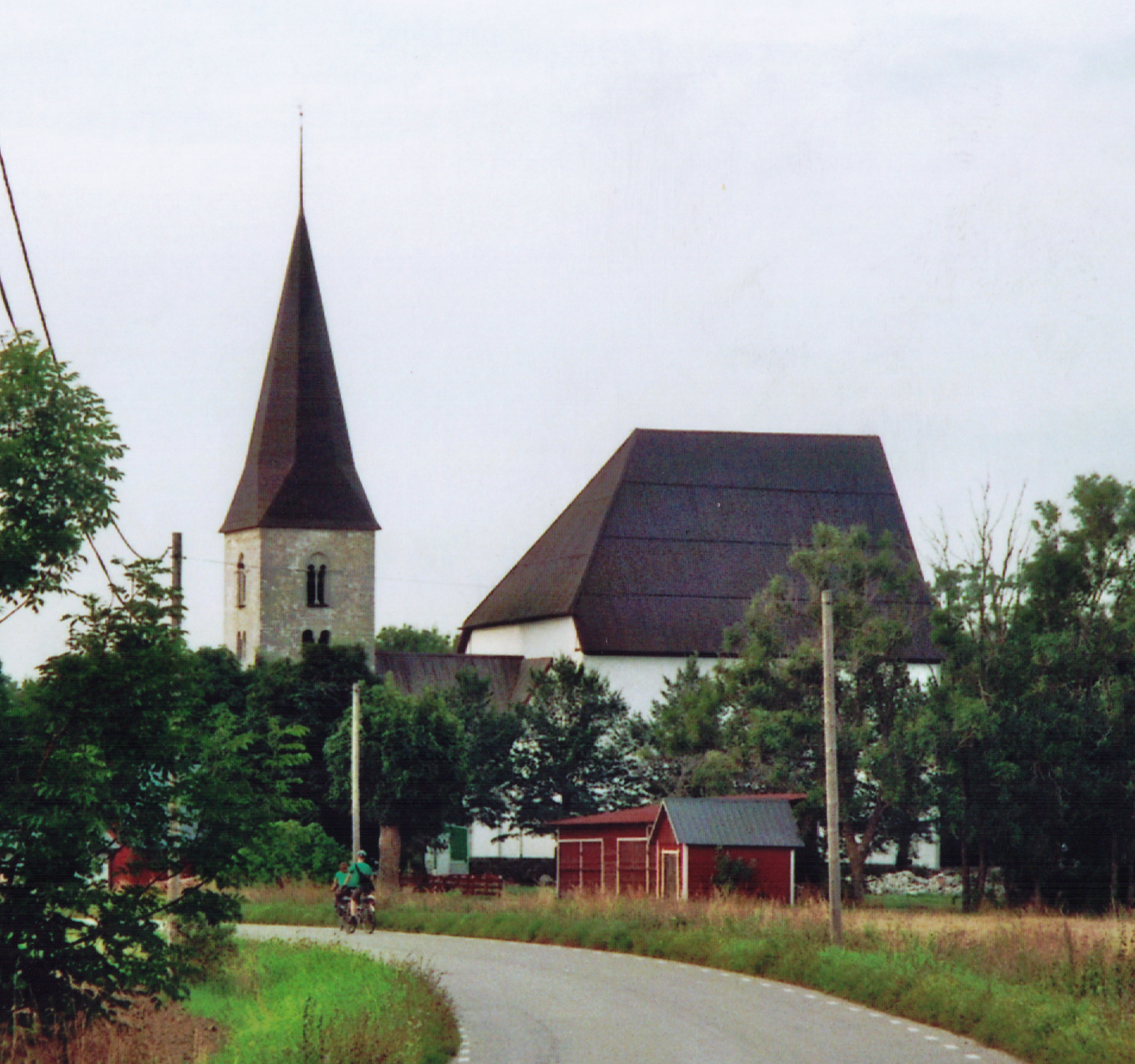
- Källunge Church

- Location within Gotland
- Coordinates: 57°36′28″N 18°35′4″E
- Country: Sweden
- Province: Gotland
- County: Gotland County
- Municipality: Gotland Municipality

Area
  - Total: 18 km^{2} (6.9 sq mi)

Population (2014)
  - Total: 196
- Time zone: UTC+1 (CET)
  - Summer (DST): UTC+2 (CEST)

Källunge is a populated area, a socken (not to be confused with parish), on the Swedish island of Gotland. It comprises the same area as the administrative Källunge District, established on 1 January 2016.

== Geography ==
Källunge is situated in the central northern part of Gotland. The medieval Källunge Church is located in the socken. As of 2019, Källunge Church belongs to Gothem parish in Norra Gotlands pastorat, along with the churches in Gothem, Norrlanda, and Vallstena.

One of the asteroids in the asteroid belt, 10545 Källunge, is named after this place.
