= Ardre, Gotland =

Ardre
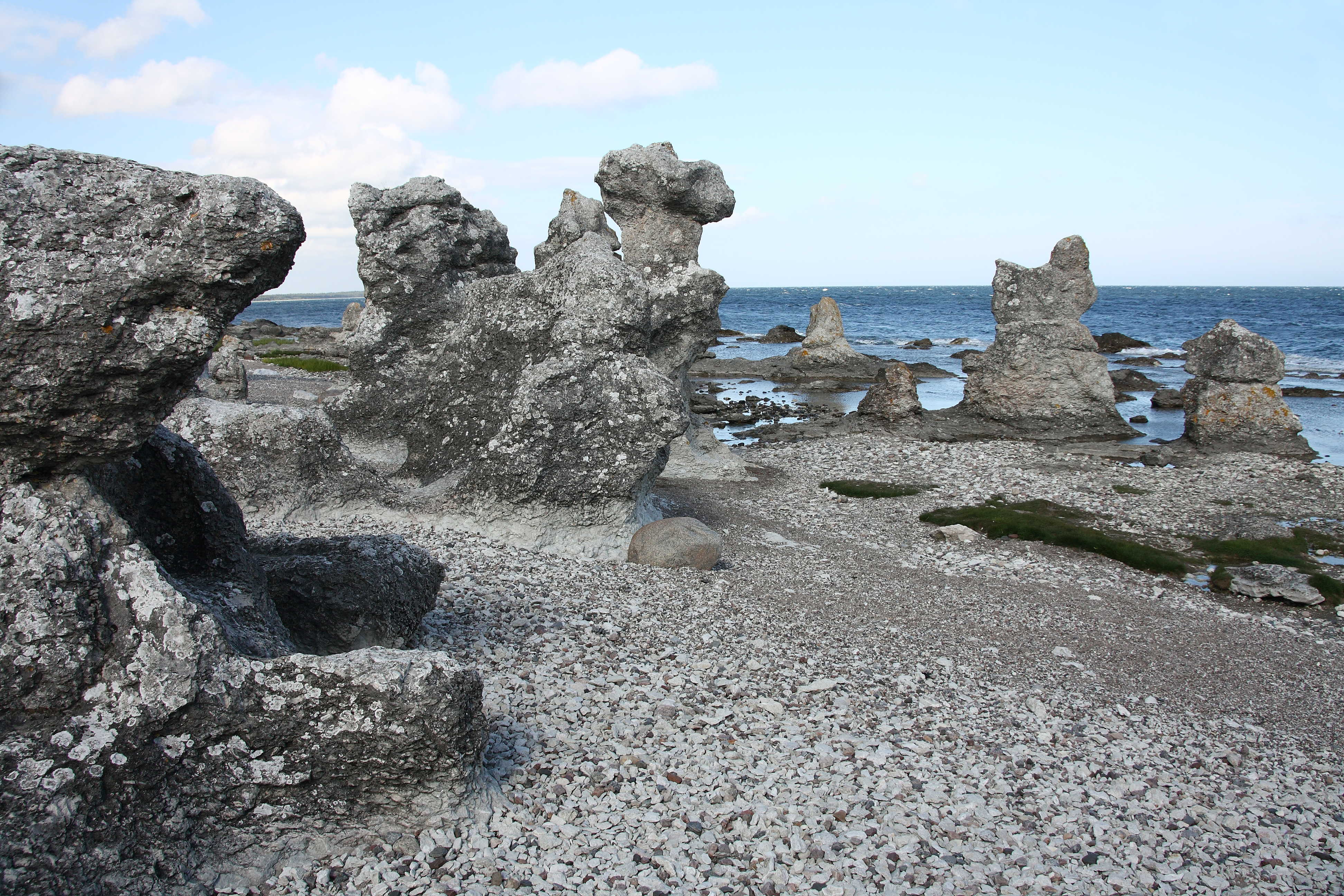
- Sea stacks at Folhammar in Ardre

- Location within Gotland
- Coordinates: 57°22′46″N 18°41′48″E
- Country: Sweden
- Province: Gotland
- County: Gotland County
- Municipality: Gotland Municipality

Area
  - Total: 38.73 km^{2} (14.95 sq mi)

Population (2014)
  - Total: 314
- Time zone: UTC+1 (CET)
  - Summer (DST): UTC+2 (CEST)

Ardre (Swedish pronunciation: [ˈɑ̂ːɖrɛ]) is a populated area, a socken (not to be confused with parish), on the Swedish island of Gotland. It comprises the same area as the administrative Ardre District, established on 1 January 2016. It is most noted for the Viking Ardre image stones found under the floor boards of the Ardre Church.

== Geography ==
Ardre is situated on the central east coast of Gotland, with the island's oldest seaside resort Ljugarn as the main locality in the socken. The medieval Ardre Church is located in Ardre. As of 2019, Ardre Church belongs to Garde parish, along with the churches in Garde, Etelhem, Alskog and Lye.

One of the asteroids in the asteroid belt, 10130 Ardre, is named after this place.
