= Akebäck =

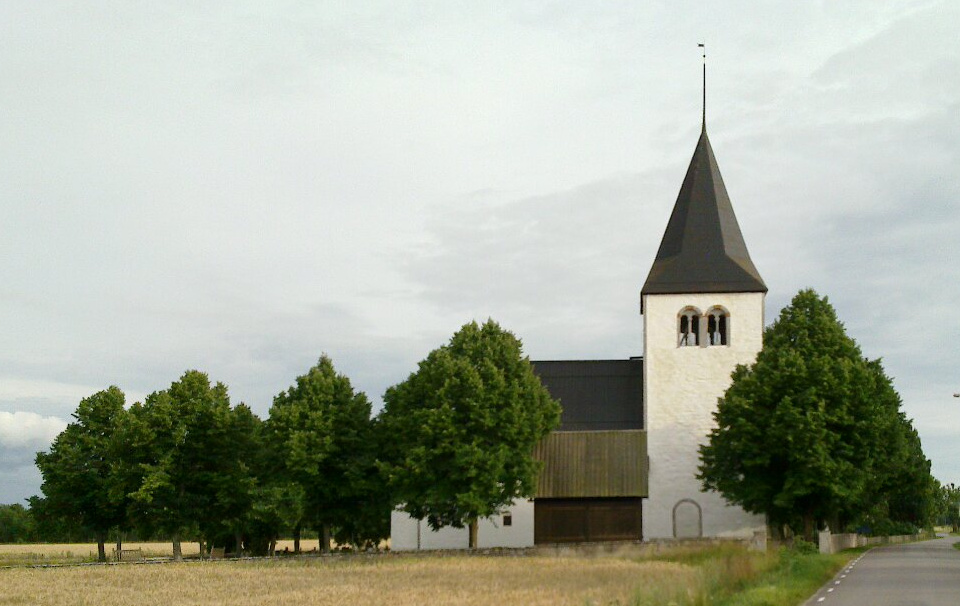
- Akebäck Church

- Location within Gotland
- Coordinates: 57°32′50″N 18°23′32″E
- Country: Sweden
- Province: Gotland
- County: Gotland County
- Municipality: Gotland Municipality

Area
  - Total: 10.57 km^{2} (4.08 sq mi)

Population (2014)
  - Total: 81
- Time zone: UTC+1 (CET)
  - Summer (DST): UTC+2 (CEST)
- Website: www.hembygd.se/akeback-hembygdsforening/

Akebäck is a populated area, a socken (not to be confused with parish), on the Swedish island of Gotland. It comprises the same area as the administrative Akebäck District, established on 1 January 2016.

== Geography ==
Akebäck is situated in the central part of Gotland. It is the smallest of the Gotland sockens. The medieval Akebäck Church is located in the socken. As of 2019, Akebäck Church belongs to Akebäck parish in Romaklosters pastorat.

One of the asteroids in the asteroid belt, 11533 Akebäck, is named after this place.
