= Alskog =

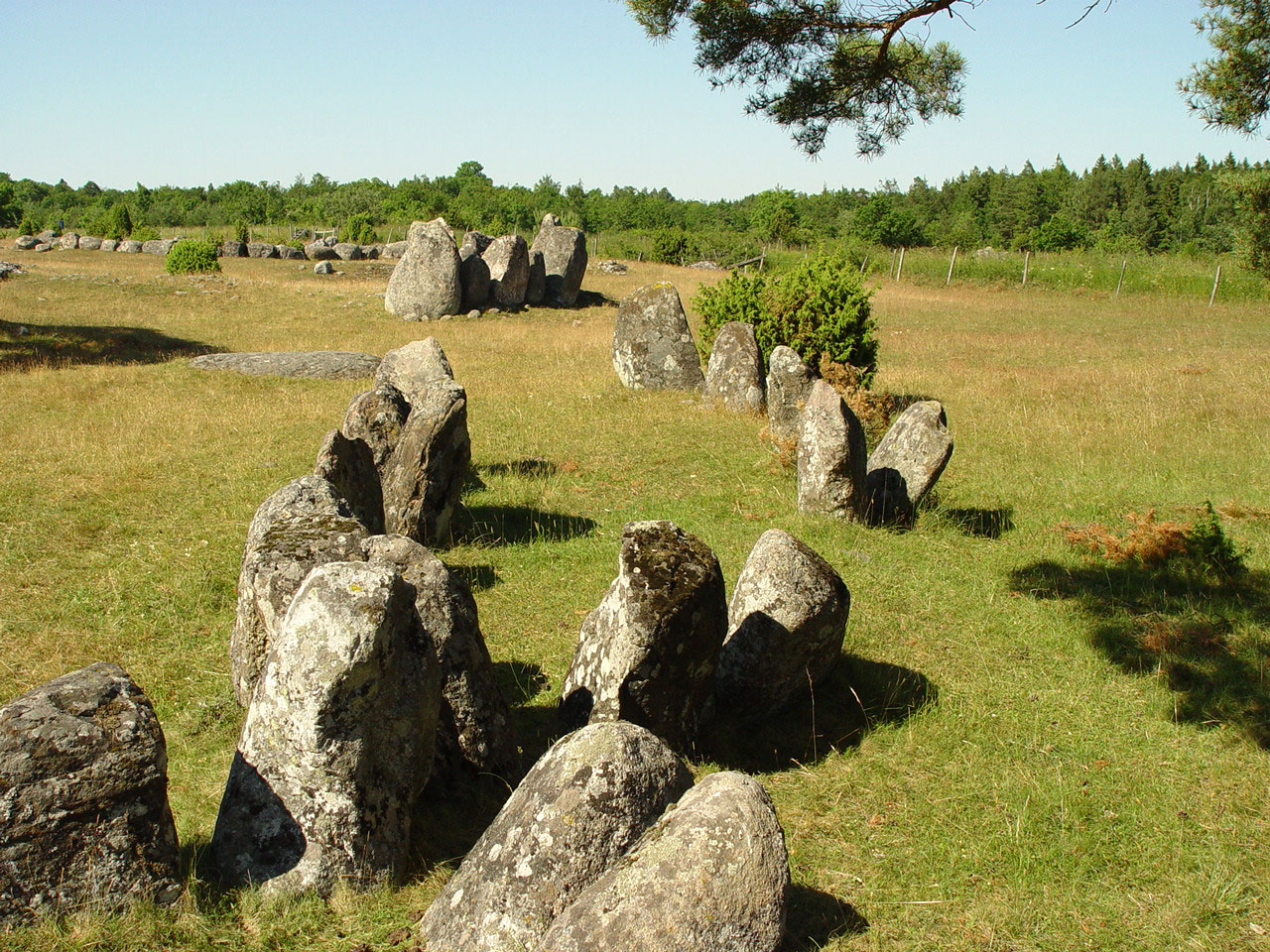
- Gålerum grave field in Alskog

- Location within Gotland
- Coordinates: 57°19′53″N 18°37′37″E
- Country: Sweden
- Province: Gotland
- County: Gotland County
- Municipality: Gotland Municipality

Area
  - Total: 38.07 km^{2} (14.70 sq mi)

Population (2014)
  - Total: 117
- Time zone: UTC+1 (CET)
  - Summer (DST): UTC+2 (CEST)

Alskog is a populated area, a socken (not to be confused with parish), on the Swedish island of Gotland. It comprises the same area as the administrative Alskog District, established on 1 January 2016.

== Geography ==
Alskog is situated in the central east part of Gotland. The medieval Alskog Church is located in the socken. As of 2019, Alskog Church belongs to Garde parish, along with the churches in Garde, Etelhem, Lye and Ardre.

The three Lau Islets just off the coast are part of Alskog, despite being named after the neighboring Lau socken. On the north part of the Alskog coastline is the sheltered harbor of Svajde fishing village.

== History ==
The Gålerum grave field in Alskog has over 200 stone settings, dating from the Bronze Age to the Iron Age. The grave field includes eight stone ships, five cairns and a picture stone. The area is sometimes erroneously referred to as Digerrojr, a cairn in Garde, south of Alskog.
