= List of Gotland-related asteroids =

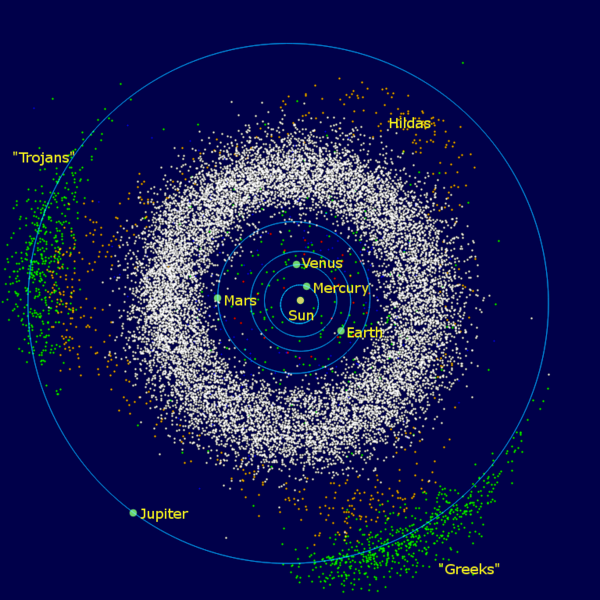
The asteroids of the inner Solar System and Jupiter: The donut-shaped asteroid belt is located between the orbits of Mars and Jupiter. Asteroid belt

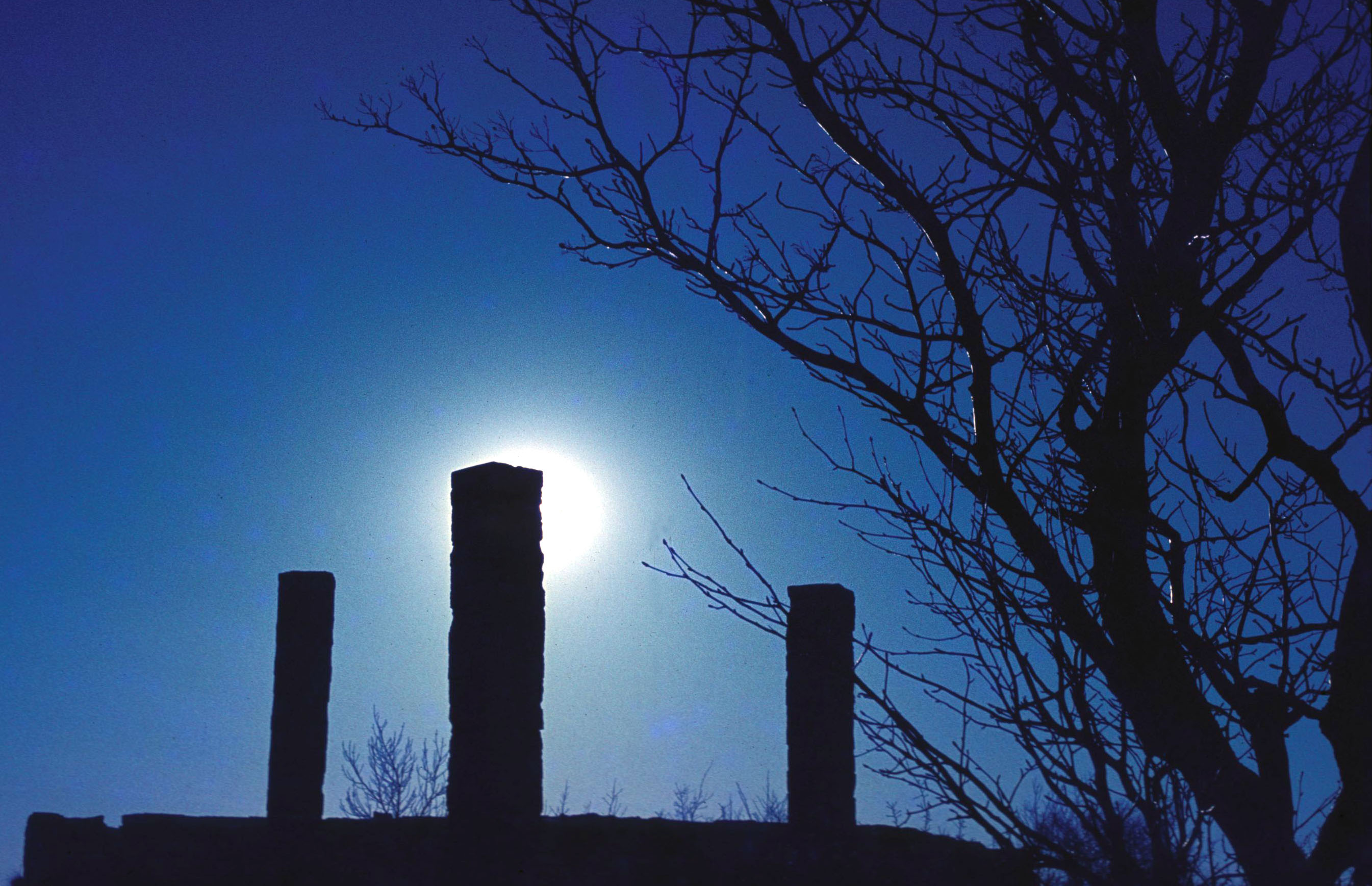
The night sky at the old gallows, Visby, Gotland

Gotland

Several asteroids or minor planets in the asteroid belt with Gotland-related names have been discovered and named by Swedish astronomer Claes-Ingvar Lagerkvist. Others have been named during courses of the Uppsala-ESO Survey of Asteroids and Comets at the European Southern Observatory and have not been credited to a single discoverer, but rather collective work.

As of January 2008, 175,658 asteroids have been numbered and almost 14,300 of those have been named. 205 have been named after places, persons or fictional figures in Sweden. A portion of these are from the island of Gotland. Gotland is fairly well represented because Lagerkvist has been a summer resident on the island since 1983.

The first asteroid to receive a Gotland-related name was 3250 Martebo in 1979, named after a settlement on the island. For the latest naming, a competition hosted by the Swedish Astronomical Society was held in Visby in 2011. The asteroid was named 137052 Tjelvar after Tjelvar, the mythological first man to bring fire to the island, thereby breaking the spell that caused Gotland to sink beneath the waves every day and rise during the night.

The suggested names are submitted to the International Astronomical Union (IAU) for inspection before they are approved. IAU want to keep the number of "troublesome" names to a minimum. Nevertheless, the name 7545 Smaklösa ("Tasteless" or "Tacky") after a Gotlandish music group, passed inspection. According to Lagerkvist: "I don't think they knew what the word meant in Swedish."

The names of the asteroids along with a description of what or who they were named after are entered into the NASA Jet Propulsion Laboratory (JPL) Small-Body Database Browser. A number of the various places on Gotland described there are sockens but referred to as parishes; a common practice since most non-Swedes are unaware of the regional distribution in Sweden and parish is the closest form to describe them. On 1 January 2016, the sockens were reconstituted into the administrative areas Districts.

This list is probably incomplete since more asteroids are named frequently.

== Asteroids ==
Asteroid name	Named after	Image	Ref
11533 Akebäck	Akebäck, a settlement and District on Gotland		
10130 Ardre	Ardre, a settlement and District on Gotland		
10795 Babben	Babben Larsson, stand-up comedy actress born in Dalhem, voted the funniest woman in Sweden		
10128 Bro	Bro, a settlement, village and a District on Gotland		
8681 Burs	Burs, a settlement, village and District on Gotland		
8678 Bäl	Bäl, a settlement and District on Gotland		
10102 Digerhuvud	Digerhuvud, a stack area on the Fårö island coast, just off the coast of Gotland		
10808 Digerrojr	Digerrojr, one of the largest cairns on Gotland, situated in Garde		
10123 Fideöja	Fide, a settlement and District on Gotland and the neighboring Öja, a settlement and District on Gotland		
9359 Fleringe	Fleringe, a settlement and District on Gotland		
10129 Fole	Fole, a settlement, village and District on Gotland		
10127 Fröjel	Fröjel, a settlement, District and formation on Gotland		
9358 Fårö	Fårö, an island, settlement and District off the coast of Gotland		
10814 Gnisvärd	Gnisvärd, a fishing village on Gotland		
10812 Grötlingbo	Grötlingbo, a settlement and District on Gotland		
9373 Hamra	Hamra, a settlement, District and formation on Gotland		
10124 Hemse	Hemse, a village, locality, District and formation on Gotland		
10104 Hoburgsgubben	Hoburgsgubben, a stack in Hoburgen on Gotland		
10105 Holmhällar	Holmhällar, a stack area in Vamlingbo on Gotland		
10544 Hörsnebara	Hörsne-Bara, a settlement and District on Gotland		
10103 Jungfrun	Jungfrun, the largest stack on Gotland, located in Lickershamn		
8682 Kräklingbo	Kräklingbo, a settlement, village and District on Gotland		
10545 Källunge	Källunge, a settlement and District on Gotland		
10811 Lau	Lau, Gotland, a settlement, village and District on Gotland		
10810 Lejsturojr	Lejstu rojr, one of the largest cairns on Gotland, situated in Rone		
10106 Lergrav	Lergrav, a fishing village and stack area in Rute on Gotland		
9267 Lokrume	Lokrume, a settlement, village and District on Gotland		
10132 Lummelunda	Lummelunda, a settlement and District on Gotland		
10126 Lärbro	Lärbro, a village, locality and District on Gotland		
10809 Majsterrojr	Majsterrojr, one of the largest cairns on Gotland, located in Gothem		
3250 Martebo	Martebo, a settlement, village and District on Gotland		
10813 Mästerby	Mästerby, a settlement, village and District on Gotland		
8680 Rone	Rone, a settlement, village and District on Gotland		
7545 Smaklösa	Smaklösa, Gotlandic music group with their own museum in Västergarn		
10553 Stenkumla	Stenkumla, a settlement, village and District on Gotland		
10125 Stenkyrka	Stenkyrka, a settlement and District on Gotland		
10131 Stånga	Stånga, a village, locality and District on Gotland		
9374 Sundre	Sundre, a settlement, village, District and formation on Gotland		
8679 Tingstäde	Tingstäde, a settlement, village and District on Gotland		
137052 Tjelvar	Tjelvar, the mythological first man on Gotland		
11308 Tofta	Tofta, a village, locality, District and formation on Gotland		
10807 Uggarde	Uggarde rojr, the largest cairn on Gotland, located in Rone		
9372 Vamlingbo	Vamlingbo, a settlement, village and District on Gotland		
6102 Visby	Visby, a town or locality, District and the seat of Gotland Municipality		
10794 Vänge	Vänge, a settlement, village and District on Gotland		
10554 Västerhejde	Västerhejde, a settlement, village and District on Gotland		
12312 Väte	Väte, a settlement and District on Gotland		
10815 Östergarn	Östergarn, a settlement and District on Gotland		
