= Gutezoo =

Coordinates: 57°19′53″N 18°37′37″E

- Interactive map of Gutezoo
- Date opened: 1993
- Date closed: 2008
- Land area: 150,000 m^{2} (1,600,000 ft^{2}) (1998)
- No. of animals: 500
- No. of species: 50 (1998)
- Owner: Peter Molin

Gutezoo was a Swedish zoo in Alskog, close to Ljugarn on the island Gotland in Sweden.

The zoo was founded by Peter Molin in 1993, and displayed kangaroos, sebra, camel, rabbits and more than five hundred animals from sixty species. There was also a mini-zoo for the youngest.

The zoo specialized in camels and display the rare white colored camel. Gutezoo was also a breeder of the Gotland pony.

In 2008, the zoo was closed and the land sold to an undisclosed buyer.
