= Väte Church =

- Väte kyrka
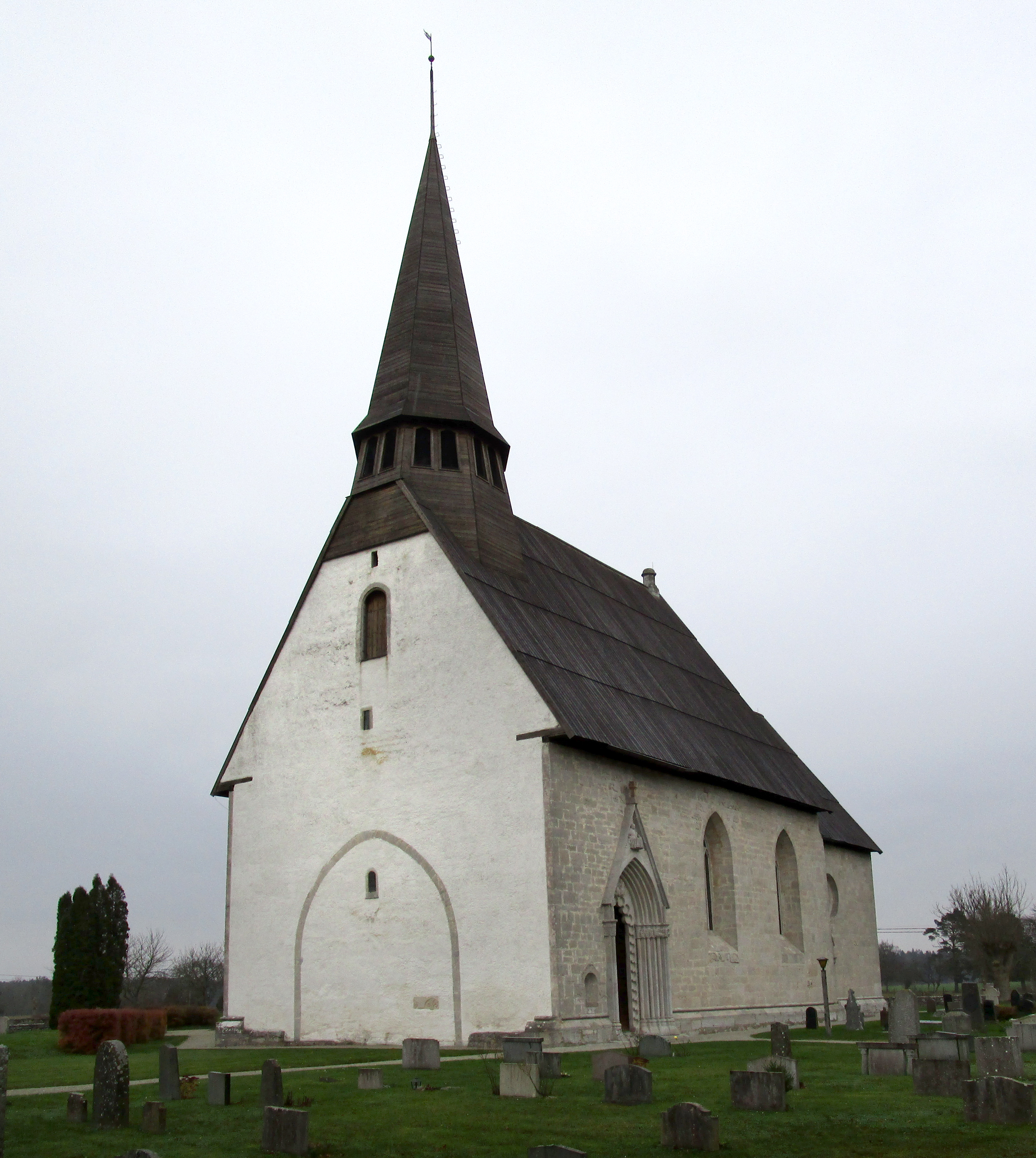
- Väte Church, view of the exterior

- Location on Gotland
- 57°26′57″N 18°21′51″E
- Country: Sweden
- Denomination: Church of Sweden

Administration
- Diocese: Visby

Väte Church (Swedish: Väte kyrka) is a medieval Lutheran church in Väte on the Swedish island of Gotland. It is in the Diocese of Visby of the Church of Sweden.

== History and architecture ==
Väte Church was built during the 14th century. The choir and sacristy are the oldest parts of the church, from circa 1300, while the nave dates from the middle of the 14th century. A tower was planned but never built. The presently visible church probably replaced an earlier, Romanesque church, of which several remains have been incorporated with the presently visible, mostly Gothic church. No major alterations have been made to Väte Church since the Middle Ages. The church spire was constructed in 1914.

The church is built of limestone. The exterior is partially decorated with Romanesque sculpture (the northern portal, decorative reliefs and window dressings), and has two Gothic southern portals with finely sculpted capitals. Inside, the church is decorated with murals. One set dates from the 14th century, another by the so-called Master of the Passion of Christ (Passionsmästaren) from the 15th century and a third by the so-called Master of 1520 (similar to murals in Alva and Lau churches). The octagonal baptismal font is made of sandstone and dates to the 12th century. The altarpiece was painted in 1780 by Johan Niklas Weller (1723–1785) who also painted the altar in 1782. The triumphal crucifix is from the 13th century.

The church has undergone restorative works three times during the 20th century: in 1927–28, in 1956 was under the direction of architect Nils Arne Rosén (1920–1998) and in 1965 under architect Olle Karth (1905–1965).
