= Källunge Church =

Church in Gotland, Sweden

Coordinates: 57.607794°N 18.584606°E

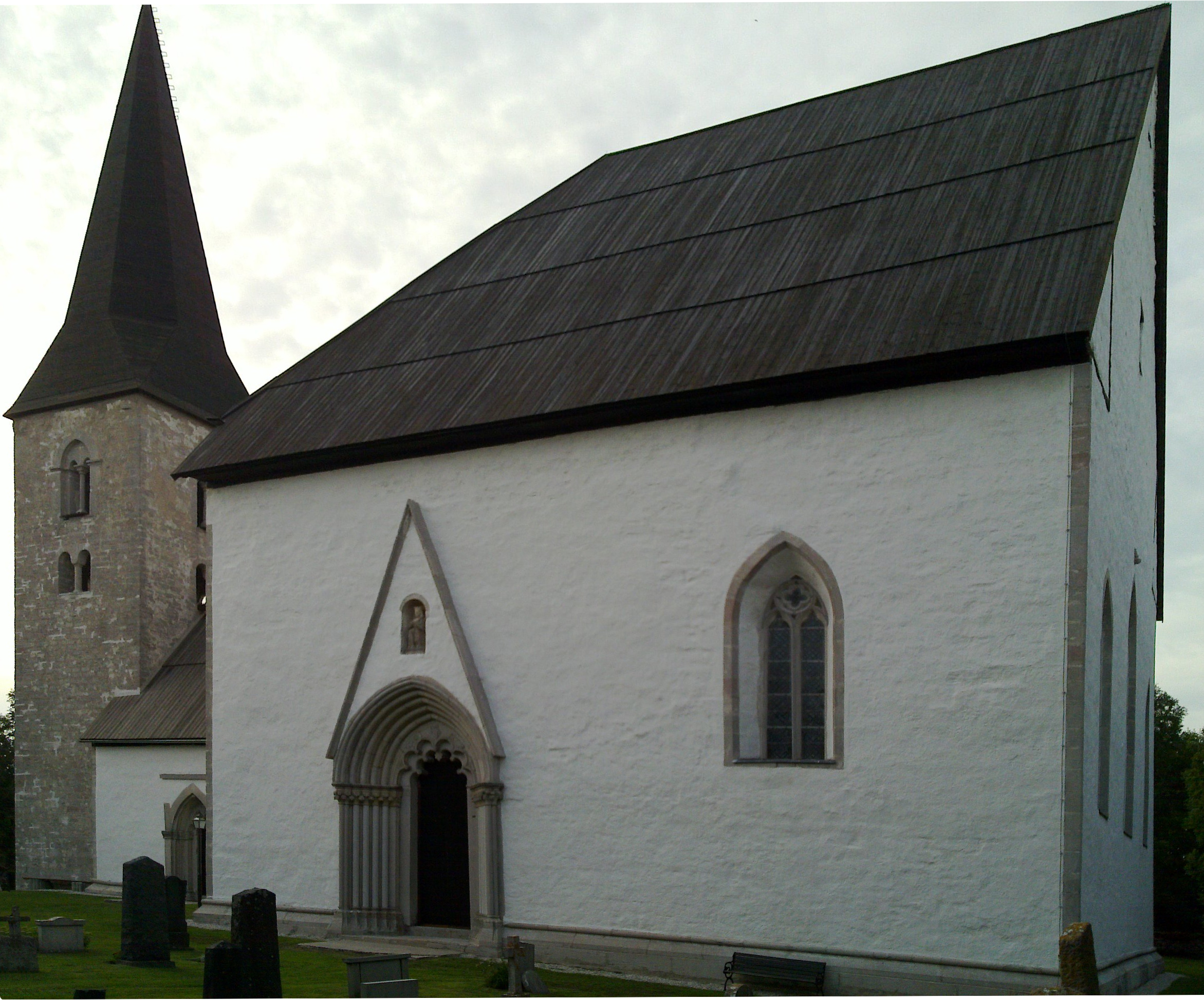
Källunge church

Källunge church (Källunge kyrka) is a church in Källunge in the Diocese of Visby on the Swedish island of Gotland. The parish of Källunge (sv:Källunge församling) was merged into Gothem parish in 2010.

The church is richly decorated with reliefs and frescoes. The frescoes are important evidence of the strong Byzantine influence on Swedish art of the 12th and 13th centuries. An early depiction of a nyckelharpa is found in a relief dating from c. 1350 on one of the gates of the church. The church gives its name to the Källunge codex (Latin Codex Kellungensis) a 1622 collection of choral music by Philipp Dulichius, Melchior Vulpius, Gregor Aichinger, Nicolaus Zangius, Hieronymus Praetorius, Hans Hassler, Jacobus Gallus, Johann Walter, Dominique Phinot, Orlando di Lasso, and Johann Bahr among others. The collection was discovered in 1913, though only the alto part is extant. About 100 of the originally ca. 315 pieces have been identified from other collections, although ca. 150 of the pieces originally included in the codex are missing to present (2016) day.

The church has a medieval baptismal font made by the anonymous Romanesque sculptor known by the assigned name Byzantios.
