= Akebäck Church =

- Akebäcks kyrka
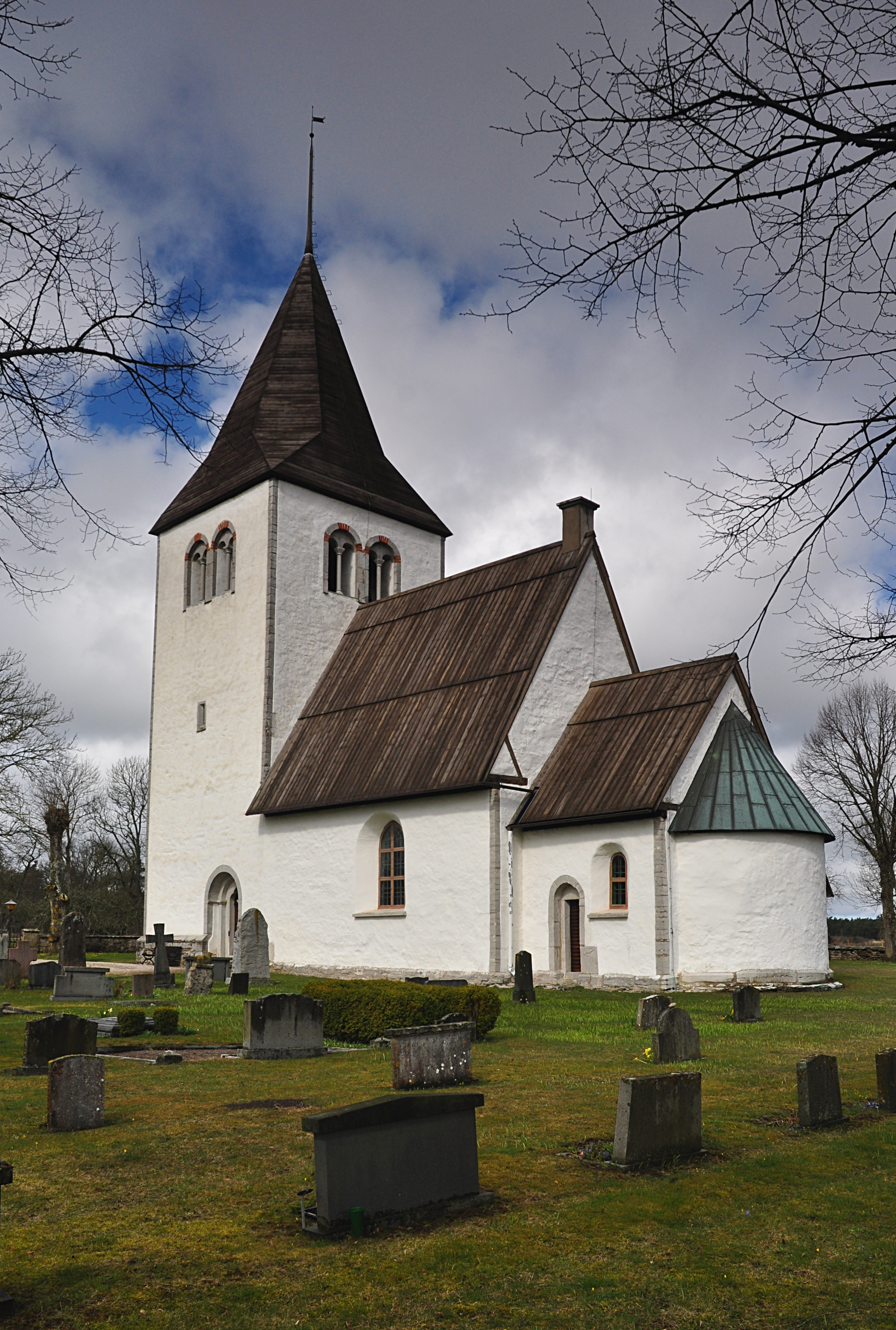
- Akebäck Church, view of the exterior

- Location on Gotland
- 57°32′51″N 18°23′33″E
- Country: Sweden
- Denomination: Church of Sweden
- Previous denomination: Catholic

Akebäck Church (Swedish: Akebäcks kyrka) is a medieval church in Akebäck on the island of Gotland, Sweden. It's a largely Romanesque church and its main construction period was at the end of the 12th century. The church is part of the Diocese of Visby within the Church of Sweden.

== History and architecture ==
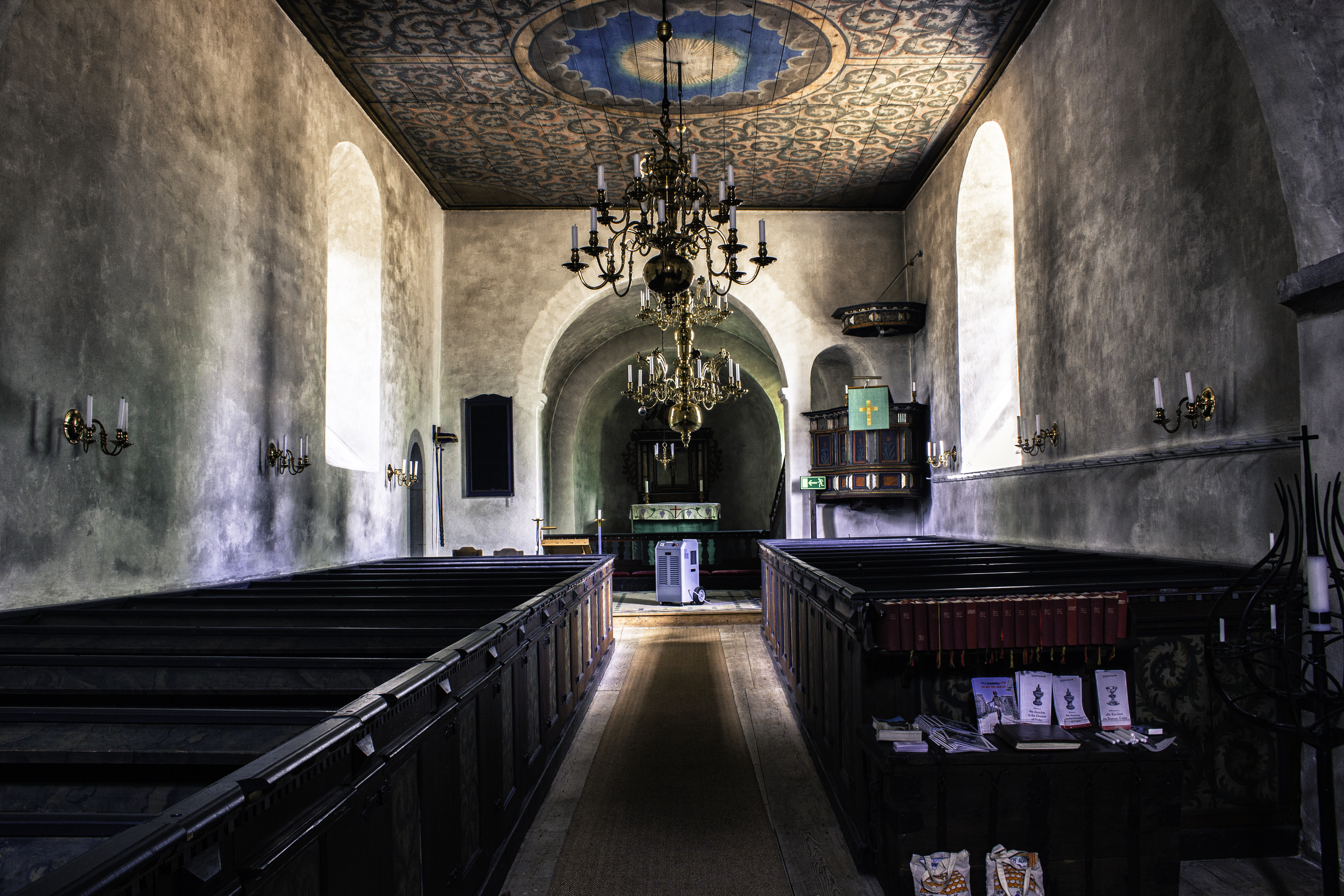
View of the interior towards the choir

Akebäck Church was constructed of plastered limestone and is, with the exception of the sacristy, a completely Romanesque church. Most of the building was done at the end of the 12th century, with the tower added during the mid-13th century. The church was inaugurated in 1149. Only the sacristy is considerably later, from 1931.

The church has an almost square choir, a semi-circular apse and a rectangular nave. It has a simple interior. Notable are the original ceramic pots which have been immured in the vault of the church, as a way to improve the acoustics. Another unusual detail is a stone sculpture depicting a stonemason lying down which is immured in the church portal. According to tradition, it was made in memory of one of the men who worked at the church but fell and died during the construction; scholars have suggested that it may on the other hand simply be a stone that was placed in the wrong direction with the picture lying down instead of standing up.

Among the furnishings, the altar is unusual in that while it is from the 17th century, the crucifix in the middle is a re-used medieval cross, from the 15th century. The baptismal font is from the 13th century. Of later date is a chandelier, donated in 1850 by a carpenter as a votive gift, "in thanks to divine providence, that kept him safe during fourteen years abroad". The smaller of the two church bells was donated in 1993.

The church underwent a renovation in 1931–32 under a proposal by architect Sven Brandel (1886–1931). During the renovation, a large picture stone was found immured in the church. It was extracted and is now displayed outside the church.

Akebäck Church belongs to the Church of Sweden and lies within the Diocese of Visby.
