= Swedish municipal reforms of 1862 =

Local administrative reform in Sweden

The Swedish municipal reforms of 1862 defined new Swedish local governments, called Kommun in Swedish and usually called municipalities in English.

Before the 1862 reform, local governments in Sweden were based on church parishes and were integrated with churches. The 1862 reforms included a constitutional change creating secular local governments.

The 1862 reforms assigned governmental functions to 2,498 municipalities and 25 county councils. Most municipalities had a small population. Later reforms reduced this number sharply to about 290 today. The municipalities had authority to tax and became the providers of most welfare services to individuals, the scope of which is defined by national laws.

Prior to 1862, only landowners had the right to vote in Sweden. In 1862, the Riksdag (Swedish Parliament) enacted legislation allowing industrialists the right to vote in local elections, and the following year, "parliament additionally decided that all local taxpayers should have votes in proportion to their tax payments." The class of voters was perhaps larger than ever before in Sweden. Taxpaying people and companies could vote, but poor people could not. Women could vote in local elections if they were of adult age, unmarried, and had a high enough independent income or property. More democratic elections were held later starting in 1919, once the Riksdag enacted universal suffrage for local elections. (The last limitations on the franchise were abolished in 1989.)

Relations between municipalities and county councils are not hierarchical; they are self-governing with their own elected officials and have different responsibilities. Citizens have a right to make a case against the municipal government in court.

== Historical contexts ==
The 1862 reform was an early part of a long trend of reforms separating the Swedish church from the Swedish state.

The Swedish municipality laws were part of a wave of changes to European constitutions that defined and recognized local government entities; other reforms were adopted in Switzerland (1803), France (1831), Belgium (1831), Denmark (1837), Norway (1837), Netherlands (1848), and Finland (1865). These changes reduced the power of national-level bureaucrats in favor of more local control.

== Naming, lexicography ==
The reforms are sometimes referred to as the 1862 Decree of Local Self-Government, or the Local Government Ordinances. The Swedish Constitution is sometimes called the Instrument of Government. The Constitutional article defining the role and powers of local government is identified in some sources as article 7.

== Impact ==
One study finds that the suffrage reform " was a key factor in Sweden’s growth miracle because it gave industrialists more political clout, kick-starting the process." The study specifically found that the extension of suffrage allowed industrialists to gain "the necessary political power to construct railways, and this led to more widespread economic development."

== See also ==
- Municipalities of Sweden
- Parishes of the Church of Sweden
