= Lau Church =

- Lau kyrka
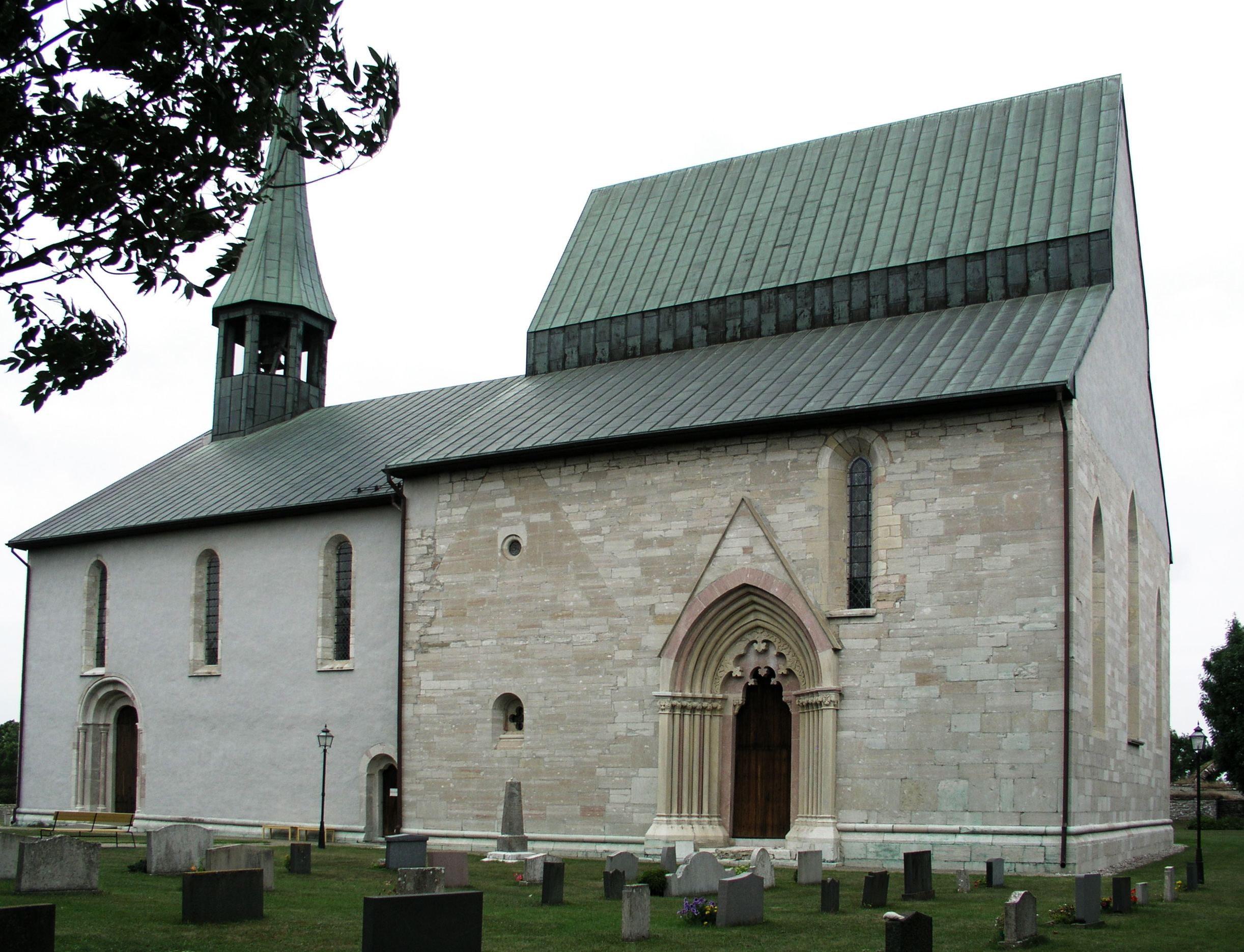
- Lau Church, view of the exterior

- Location on Gotland
- 57°16′58″N 18°37′13″E
- Country: Sweden
- Denomination: Church of Sweden

Administration
- Diocese: Visby

Lau Church (Swedish: Lau kyrka) is a medieval church on the Swedish island of Gotland, in the Diocese of Visby. It is an unusually large church, and may have been used by Dominicans preaching for the Crusades.

== History ==
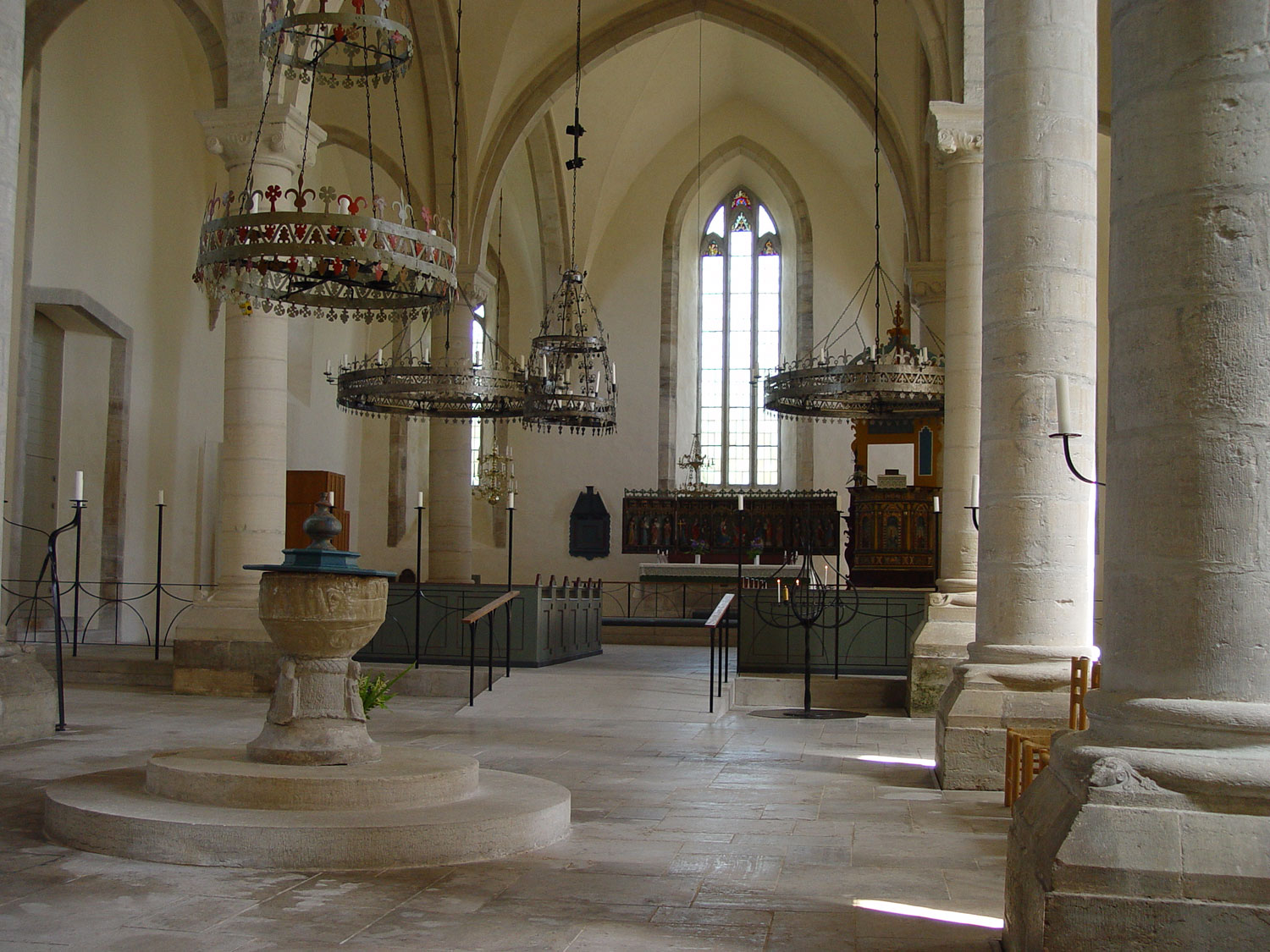
The interior of the church

The church of Lau dates from the early 13th century, but was possibly pre-dated by a Romanesque church on the same site. Just south of the church are also the remains of a defensive tower, dating from the 12th century and later converted into a rectory (since destroyed). Far earlier, the area around the present-day church seems to have been a place of importance as pre-Christian grave fields, several centuries older than the church, have been found both north and south of the church.

The oldest part of the church is the unusually large nave, dating from the early 13th century and Romanesque in style. The likewise grand choir dates from around 1300, and possibly more specifically from before 1288 when a short civil war on the island may have disrupted building plans. The church is one of the largest (during the 13th century the largest) country churches on Gotland, situated in a relatively small parish. Scholars speculate as to why such a large church was built at the site. Some believe that the unusual size and grandeur of the church was an effect of the church being situated near the coast, close by a good natural harbour, and the parish may have benefited economically from foreign trade. Another theory is that it may have served as a church for pilgrims. Most probably however, the church may have drawn crowds as one of a few churches outside Visby where the island's Dominican friars used to preach for a crusade against Courland, Livonia and Prussia. It is known through several preserved papal letters that the popular Dominicans were explicitly asked to preach for crusades not only in Visby but also on certain places in the countryside, and scholars have concluded that Lau Church was probably one of these sites.

No major alterations have been made to the church since the Middle Ages. A through renovation of the church was carried out in 1958-1960.

== Architecture ==
As mentioned, the church is one of the largest medieval country churches on Gotland. It has five external portals, the most of any country church on the island. Especially the Romanesque portals of the nave are noteworthy, richly sculpted and unusually large. The church lacks a tower; it can be deducted from the way the west end of the church is built that plans to build one existed but for one reason or another it was never executed.

The interior is dominated by the high vaulted ceiling, carried by large columns with sculpted bases and capitals. On the western wall are murals from 1520, depicting the Last Judgement. A few remains of the original stained glass windows remain.

The church has some notable furnishings. The altarpiece, depicting the Coronation of the Virgin, is from the beginning of the 15th century but later (18th century) re-painted. The triumphal cross of the church is one of the largest in the Nordic countries, dating from the mid-13th century. The baptismal font is a work by the Romanesque sculptor Sigraf.
