= Ljugarn =

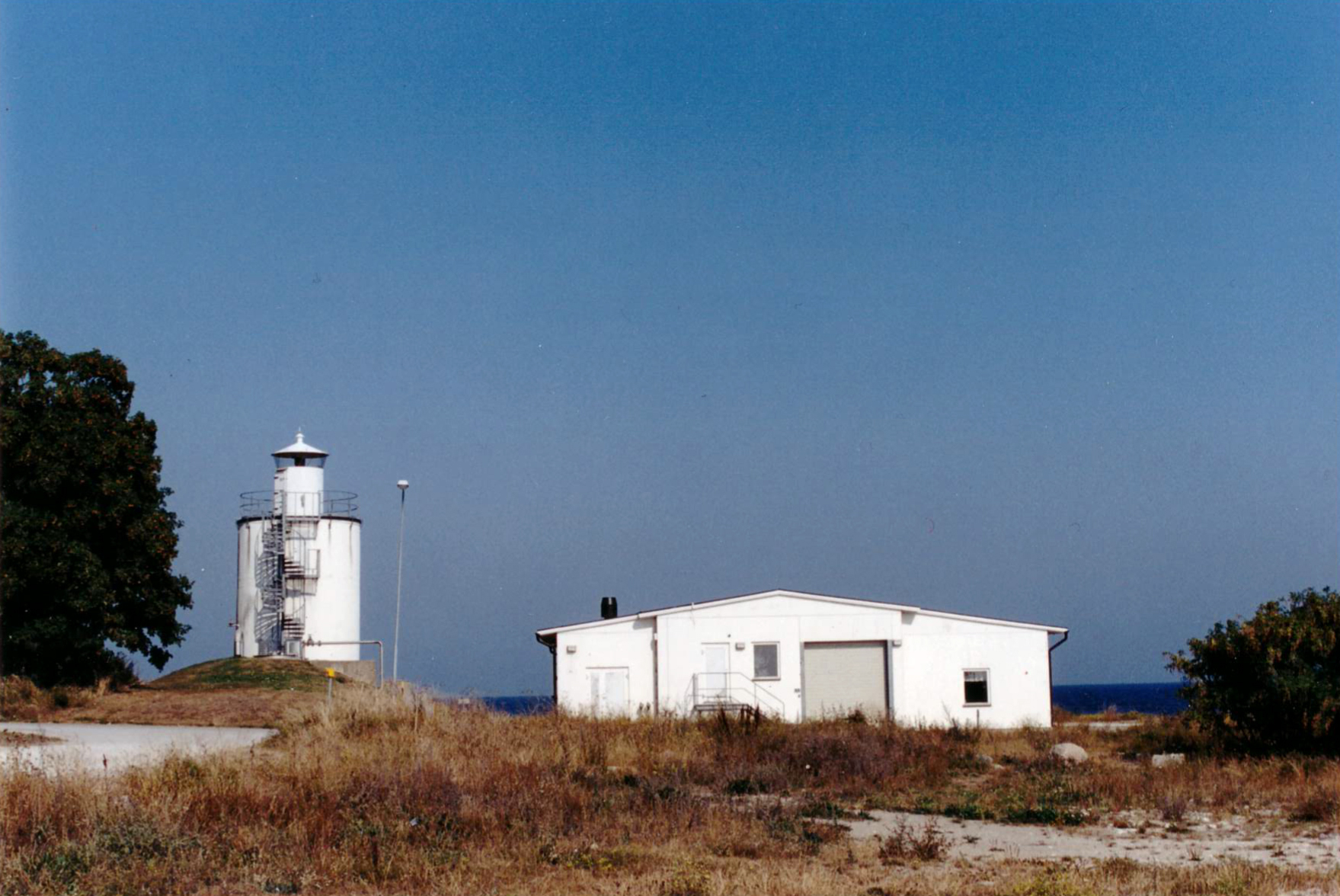
- Ljugarn lighthouse

- Location within Gotland
- Coordinates: 57°19′N 18°42′E
- Country: Sweden
- Province: Gotland
- County: Gotland County
- Municipality: Gotland Municipality

Area
  - Total: 1.56 km^{2} (0.60 sq mi)

Population (31 December 2010)
  - Total: 200
- Time zone: UTC+1 (CET)
  - Summer (DST): UTC+2 (CEST)
- Website: www.ljugarn.com

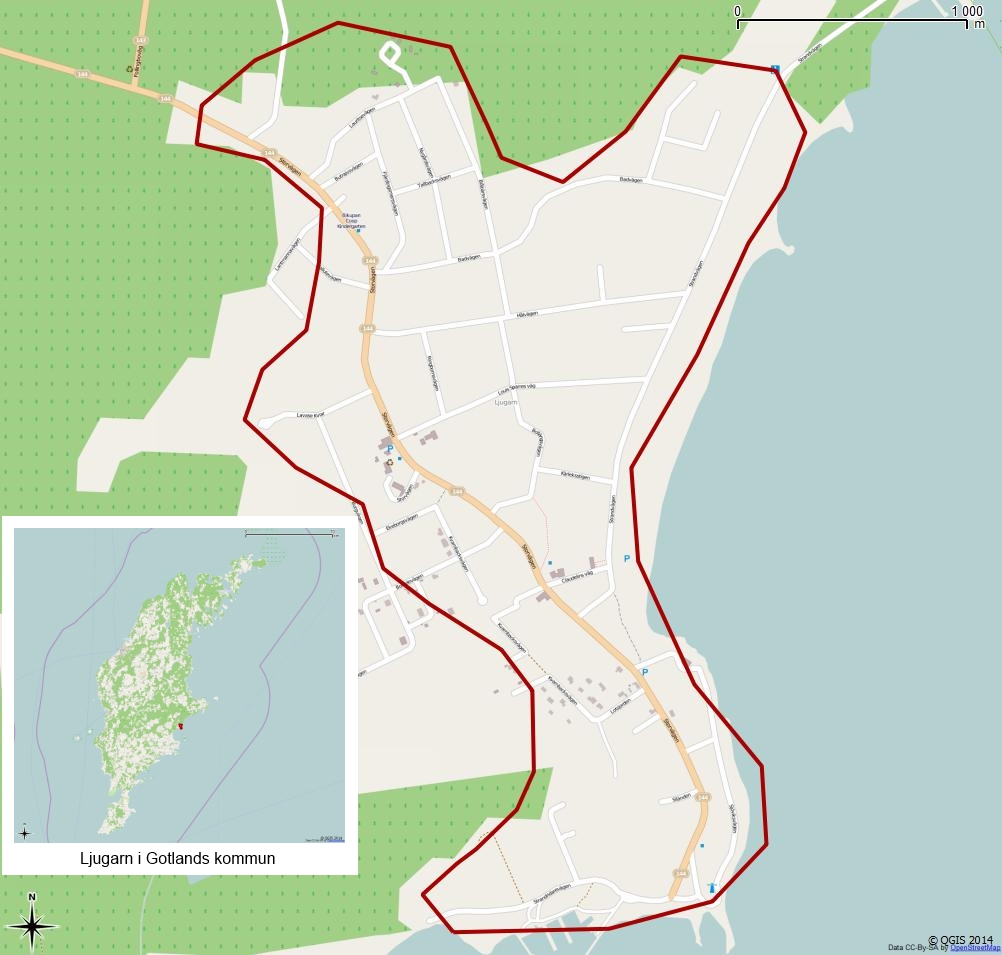
The Ljugarn village in 1990.

Population of Ljugarn 1960–2010
| Year | Pop. |
|---|---|
| 1960 | 329 |
| 1965 | 308 |
| 1970 | 281 |
| 1975 | 255 |
| 1980 | 251 |
| 1990 | 262 |
| 1995 | 276 |
| 2000 | 295 |
| 2005 | 275 |
| 2010 | 238 |
Source: "Statistiska centralbyrån – Folkmängd i tätorter 1960-2005”. From the original 23 June 2011. Retrieved 8 February 2012. ”Statistiska centralbyrån – Småorter 2010”. From the original 15 October 2012. Retrieved 25 October 2012.

Ljugarn (Swedish pronunciation: [ˈjʉ̂ːɡɑːɳ]) is a locality on the Swedish island of Gotland, with 200 inhabitants in 2014. It is located on the east coast of the island in Ardre south of Slite. It is regarded as a popular and quiet area as well as holiday village for tourists and vacationers. Ljugarn is the oldest seaside resort in Gotland, and was formerly a port, fishing village, pilot station and the county seat of Ljugarn County. The 1.5 km (0.93 mi) long flat sandy beach, one of the longest in Gotland, is visited throughout the year. Since the early 20th century the village has had pensions, restaurants, hostels, coffee-shops and a grocery store.

== Etymology ==
The name "Ljugarn" has been in use since 1646, when the location was described as Lougards hamn ("Lougards harbor") and in 1695, the village is referred to as Långgarns hamn ("Långgarns harbor"). The addendum garn is used in many Gotlandic place names; it means "intestine" and is figuratively used for capes. The meaning of the prefix is obscure; one interpretation is that it is a form of the old Norse word lju, meaning "light", but this is not corroborated by the Svenskt ortnamnslexikon ("The Swedish place names encyclopedia") or the Nationalencyklopedin.

== History ==
Ljugarn is an old harbor situated between Sudertredingen and Medeltredingen, two of the three parts ("tredingar") Gotland was divided into before and during the Middle Ages. These "tredingar" are mentioned as early as in the Gutasaga. The listed building Strandridaregården is believed to have been built in the 1720s. The last Strandridare ("customs officer") left Ljugarn in 1822.

=== Trade ===
Lime, limestone, tar and lumber was exported from the Ljugarn harbor up until the 19th century. In 1880 the Storugnen ("The big kiln") was extinguished, thereby ending the lime burning era. The remains of the lime kilns can still be found at the harbor. In 1828, the Donner trading house got permission to conduct trade at Ljugarn. When The Donners were declared bankrupt in 1845, trade came to be dominated by Olof Gottfrid Claudelin and two succeeding generations of Claudelins. The "Claudline House" remains in the central part of the village together with a larger limestone house from circa 1600–1700, rebuilt in the 1870s.

=== Seaside resort ===
The first bathers in Ljugarn, 1887, are said to have been Adolf Hauffman, a teacher living in Stockholm who was from Östergarn, and his friend Sigurd Bolin. They also marketed Ljugarn such that it subsequently became the first seaside resort on Gotland. Gotland had become very popular with socialites at the time through Princess Eugenie who lived in Västerhejde, in the west part of the island from the 1860s. Ljugarn became an elegant resort: large scale summer villas were built along the Strandvägen ("The beach road") and during the 1930s there were no less than five seaside pensions in Ljugarn. Among these were Ljugarns pensionat, Pensionat Lövängen and Pensionat Bringsarve.

Among the more noted summer guests were Municipal commissioner Yngve Larsson, who built the "Barnarve" estate in 1919, the artist Louis Sparre who built "Sandarve" in 1914 close by, and the admiral and marine artist Jacob Hägg.

The Ljugarn holiday resort was founded in 1955. It was initially called the Vitvärs holiday resort and was the first of its kind on Gotland. Vitvär is a small fishing village in Ljugarn. In 1953 the Ljugarn Society was founded as a division of the Gotland heritage association. The Ljugarn Society still owns a sauna house at a prime location south of the beach, and a post mill.

As of 2014 Ljugarn is still one of Gotland's main seaside resorts with restaurants, coffee shops, hotels and pensions. There are two small museums at Ljugarn, managed by the Ljugarn Cape Cultural Society and the Ljugarn Golf Club.

== Gallery ==
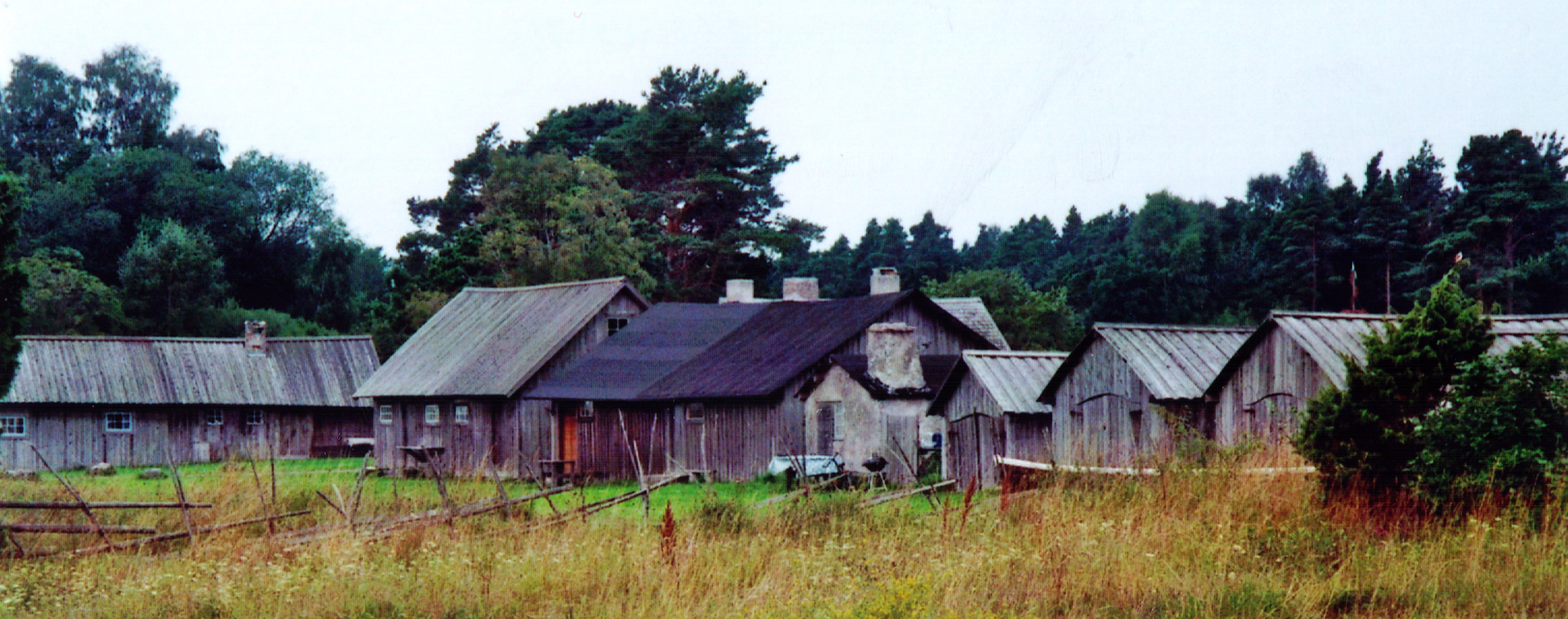
Vitvär fishing village.

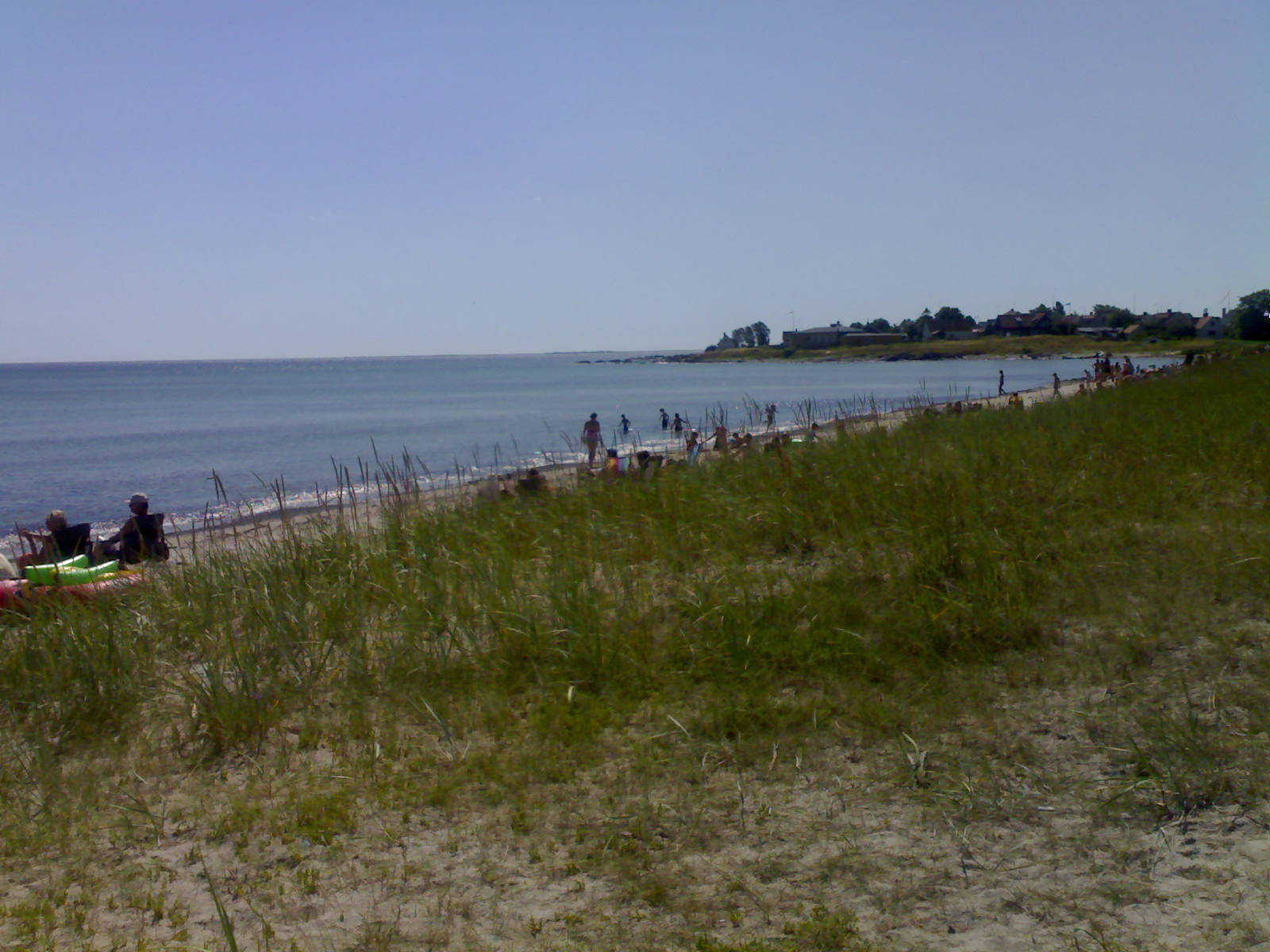
Ljugarn beach

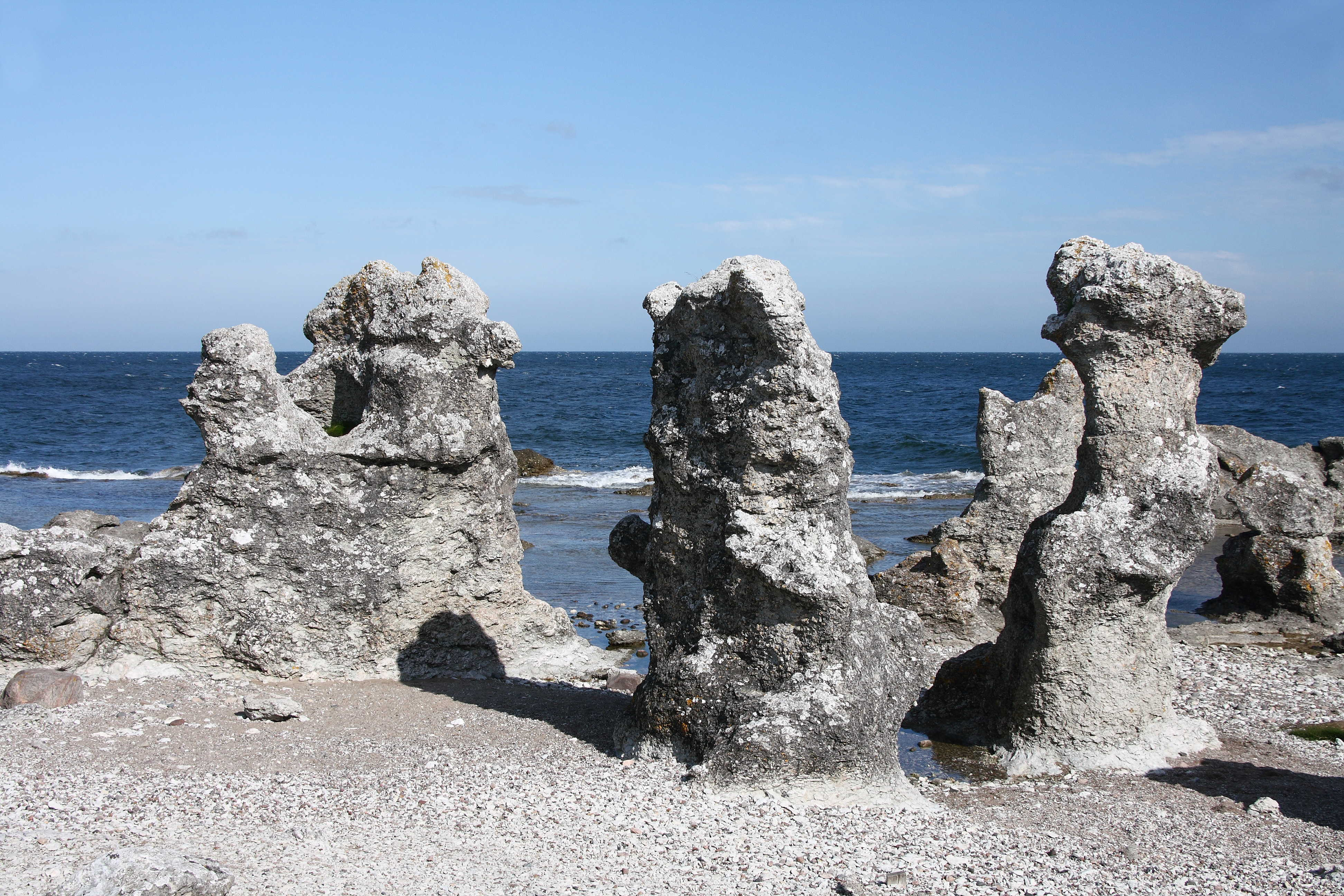
Folhammar rauks just north of the beach in Ljugarn.

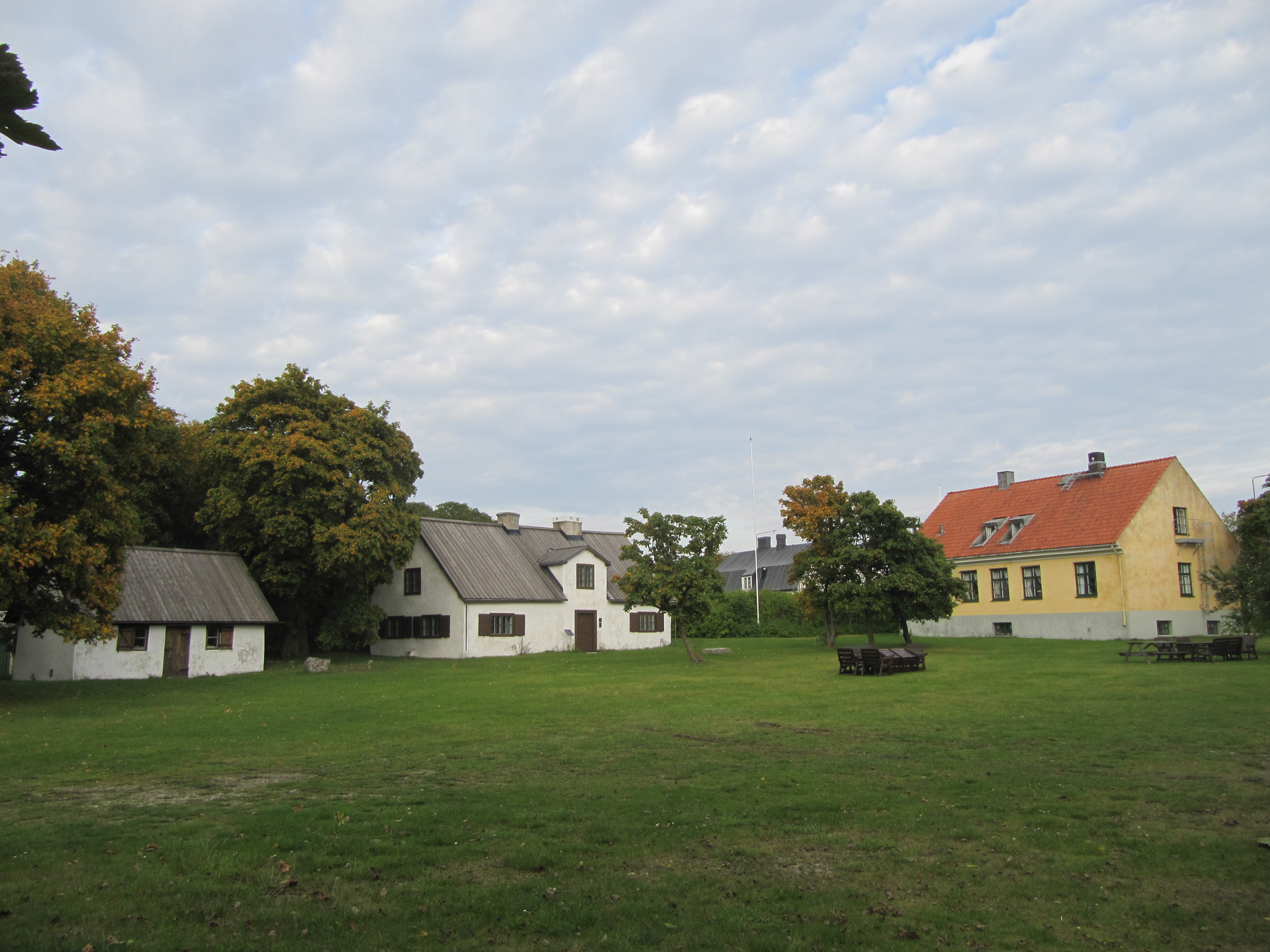
Strandridaregården and the old Customs house.

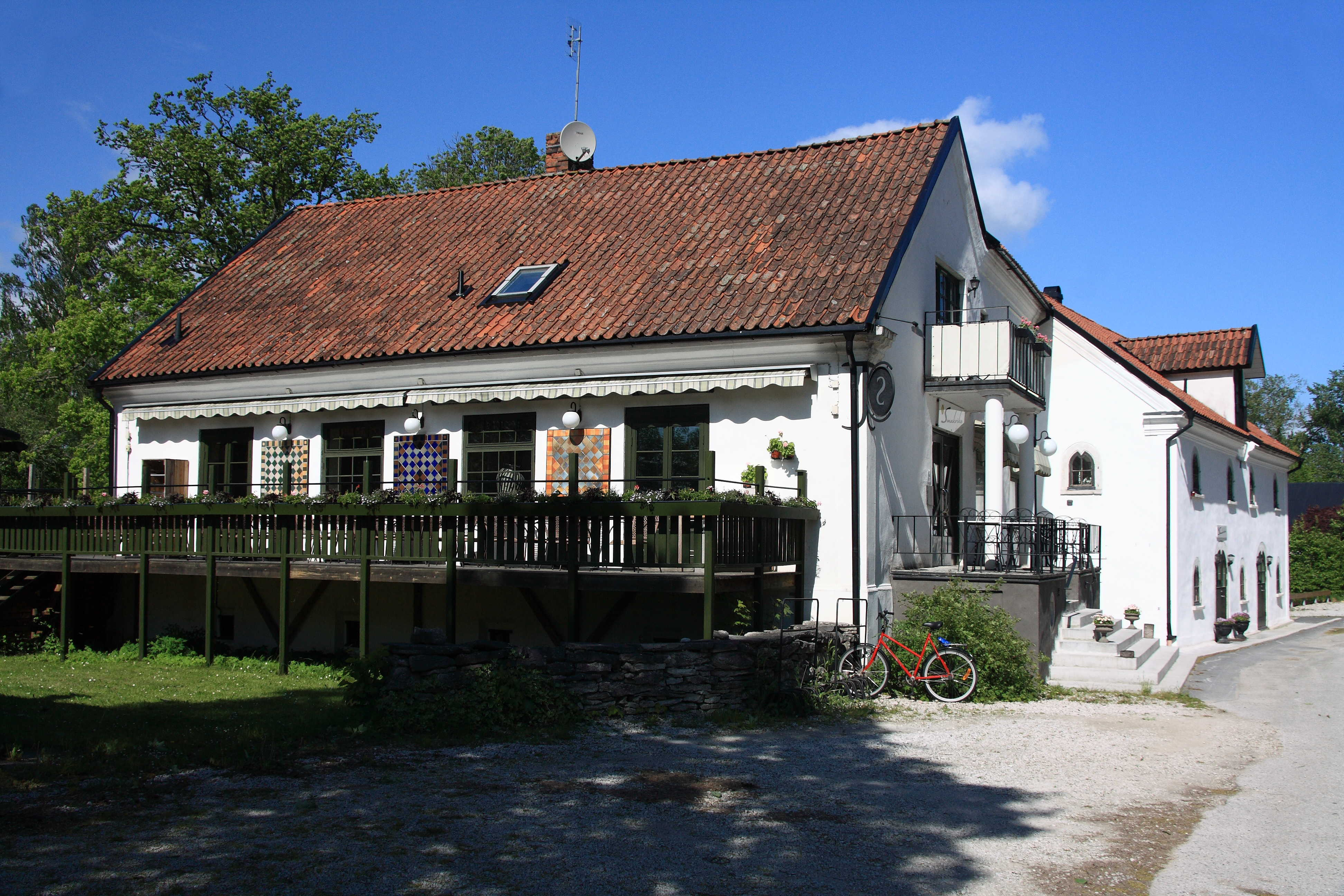
Smakrike reataurant & lodging.
