= Socken =

Part of a county in Sweden

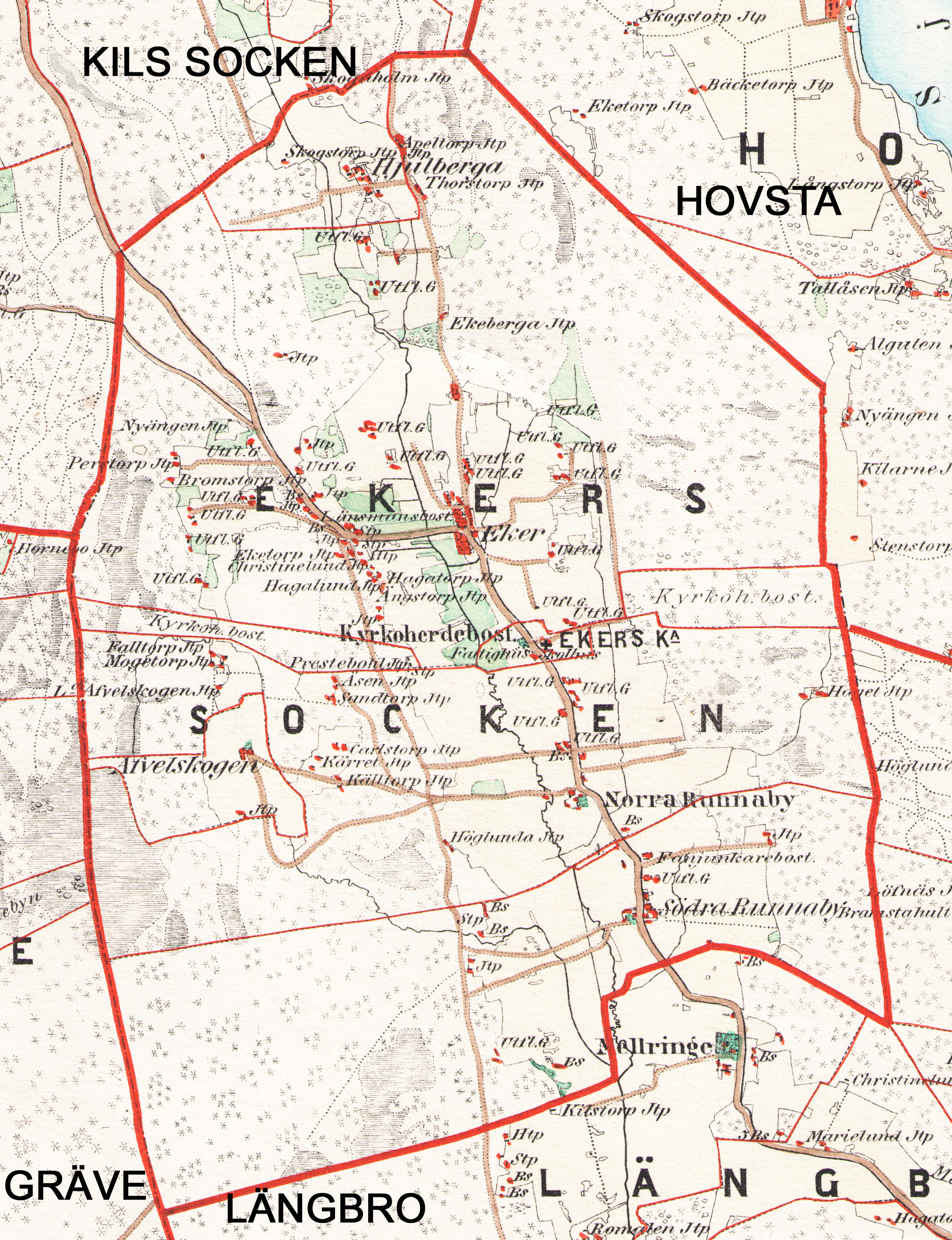
Eker's socken in Närke on a map of Örebro hundred

Socken (Swedish: [ˈsʊ̌kːɛn] or [ˈsɔ̌kːɛn]) is the name used for a part of a county in Sweden. In Denmark, similar areas are known as sogn, in Norway sokn or sogn and in Finland pitäjä or socken. A socken is a rural area formed around a church, typically in the Middle Ages. A socken originally served as a parish. Later, until the Swedish municipal reforms of 1862, it also served as a civil parish or an administrative parish, and became a predecessor to today's municipalities of Sweden, Finland, Norway and Denmark. Today it is a traditional area with frozen borders, in Sweden typically identical to those of the early 20th century rural parishes. The socken also served as a registration unit for buildings, in Sweden recently replaced by identical registration districts as registration unit. A socken consists of several villages and industry localities (company towns), and is typically named after the main village and the original church.

== Sweden ==
=== History ===
Socken, in Old Swedish sokn (compare: Danish and bokmål sogn, nynorsk sokn) is an archaic name for the original country church parishes, kyrksocken. It also describes a secular area, a sockenkommun (rural area locality) or a taxation area, a jordbokssocken. In the Nordic countries a socken was an administrative area consisting of several villages or localities in much the same way as the civil parishes in England, but the concept is not used in reference to towns. A socken had a socken church, it was governed by a socken council and it was the predecessor to modern municipalities

In 1862, the kyrksocknar (church sockens) and the sockenkommuner (rural area localities) in Sweden were abolished as administrative areas during municipality reforms. The jordbrukssocken (taxation area) remained in use until fastighetsdatareformen (Reform for registration of real property) 1976–1995 was complete. No further alterations to the sockens was made after this.

On 1 January 2016, a new administrative division and area for Statistics Sweden, registration districts, was introduced in Sweden. Geographically, the districts correspond with the parishes of the Church of Sweden as of 31 December 1999. About 85% of the old sockens corresponds with the new districts.

Even though the term socken is no longer used administratively in Sweden, it is still used for cataloging and registering historical archives (Swedish National Heritage Board), botany, dialect research, toponymy and by local historical societies. Socken is a convenient parameter for these purposes since it does not change with time.

=== Lists of sockens ===
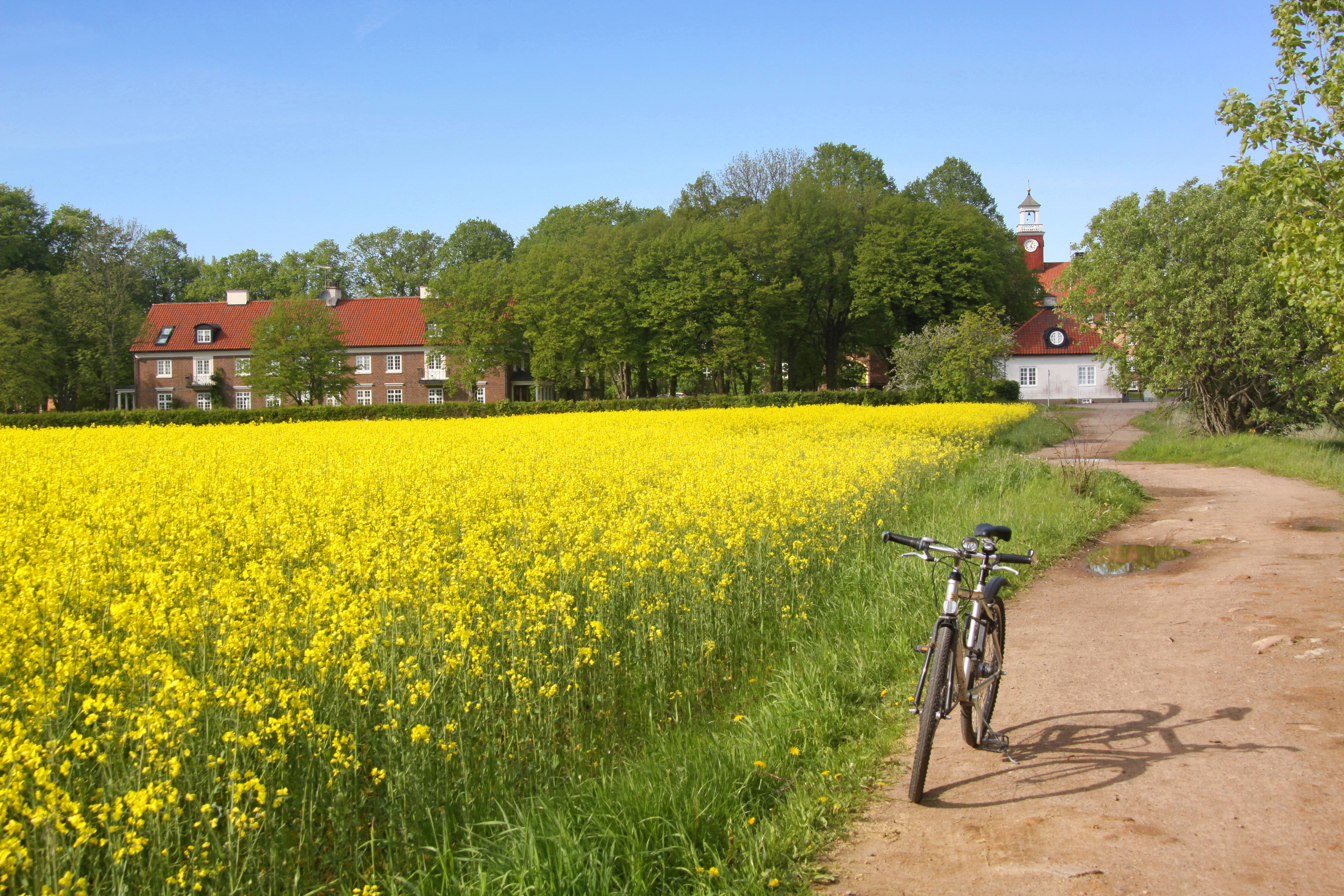
Skåne, a place where socken is in use

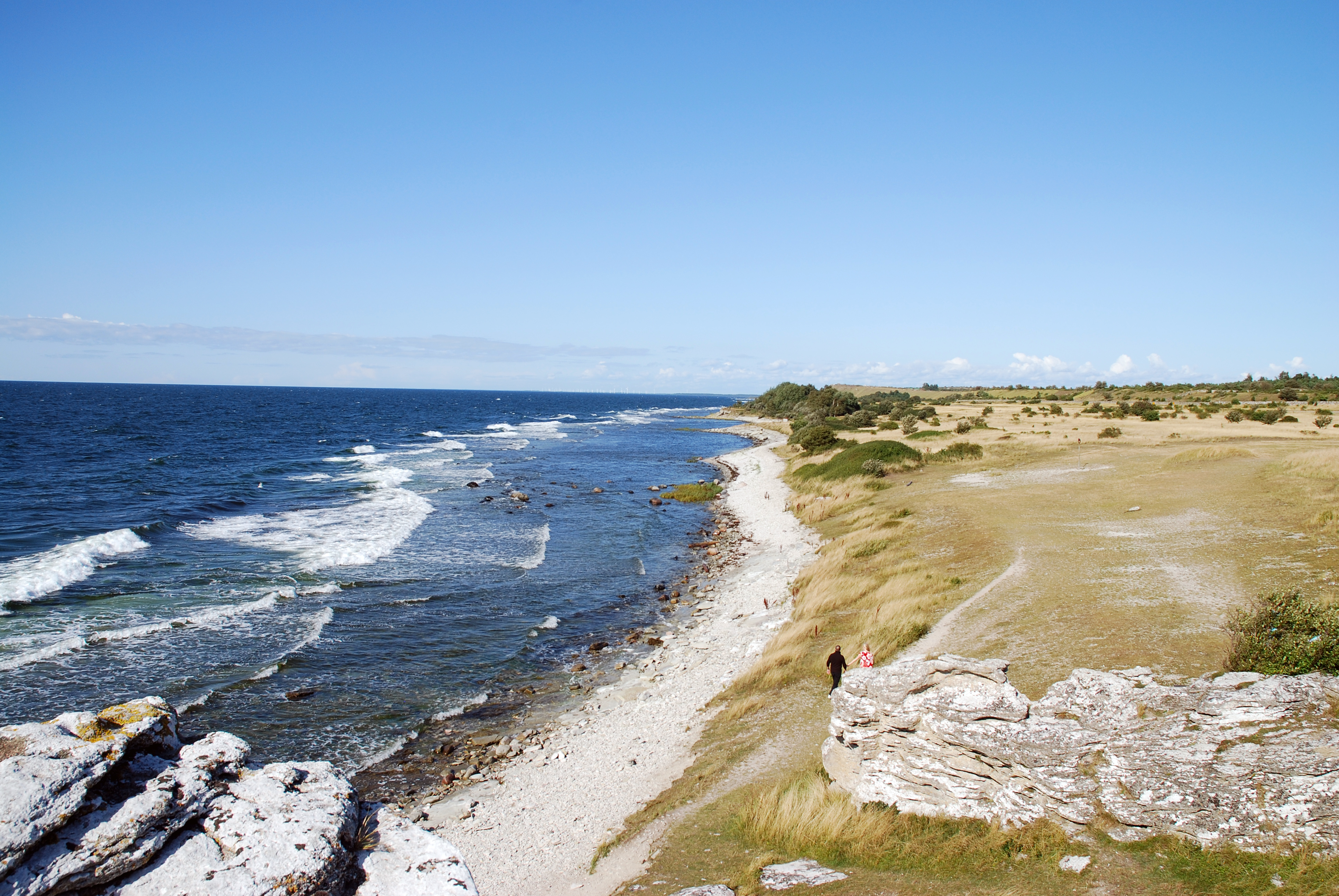
Gotland, a place where socken is in use

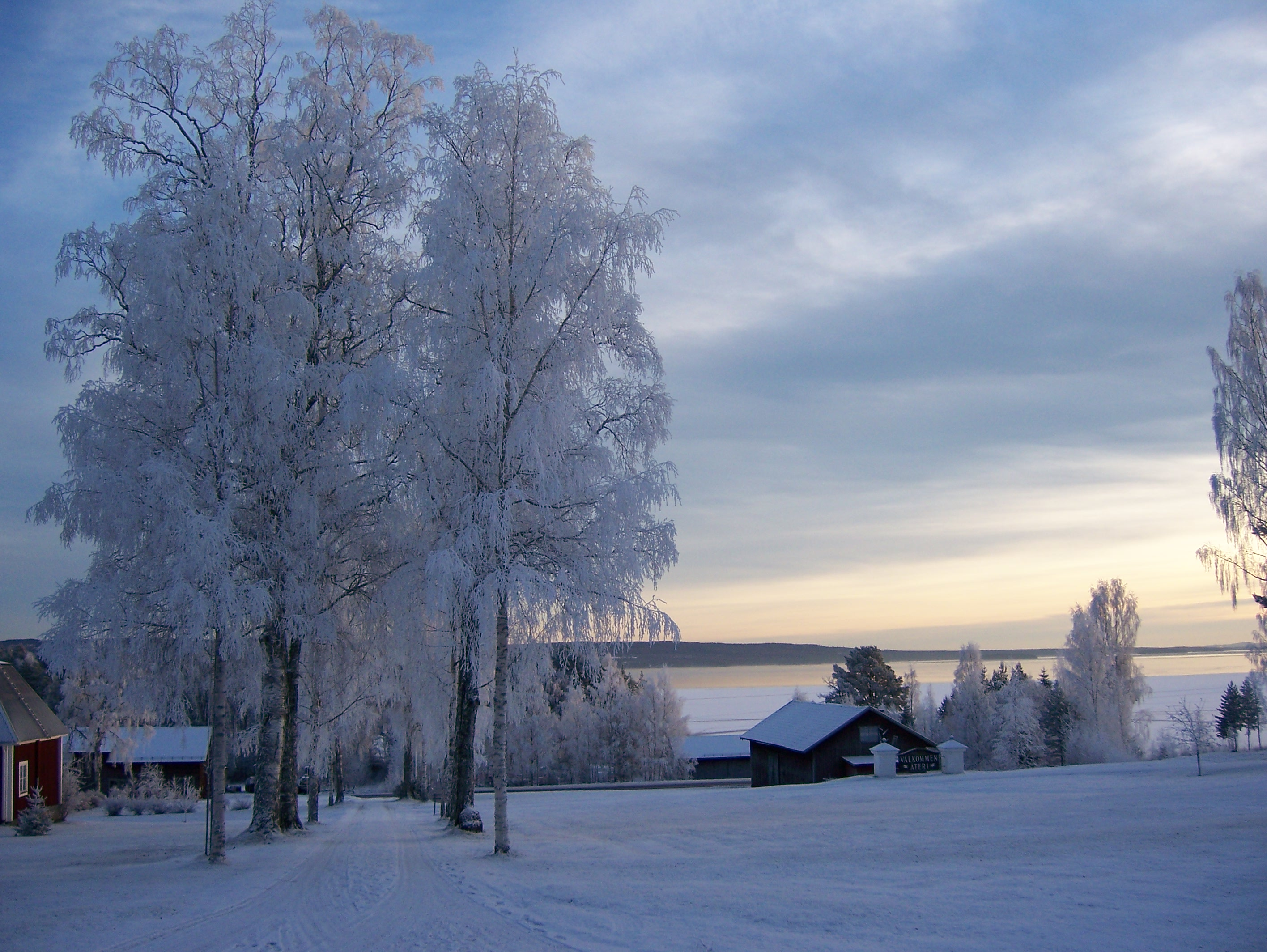
Dalarna, a place where socken is in use

- List of sockens in Sweden on Swedish Wikipedia, sv:Kategori:Socknar i Sverige

== See also ==
- Administrative divisions of Sweden
- Civil parishes in England
- Historical region
- Hundred (county division)
- Municipalities of Sweden
- Parish (Denmark)
- Parishes of the Church of Sweden
- Soke (legal)
- Townships of the People's Republic of China
