= Registration districts in Sweden =

Type of administrative division in Sweden

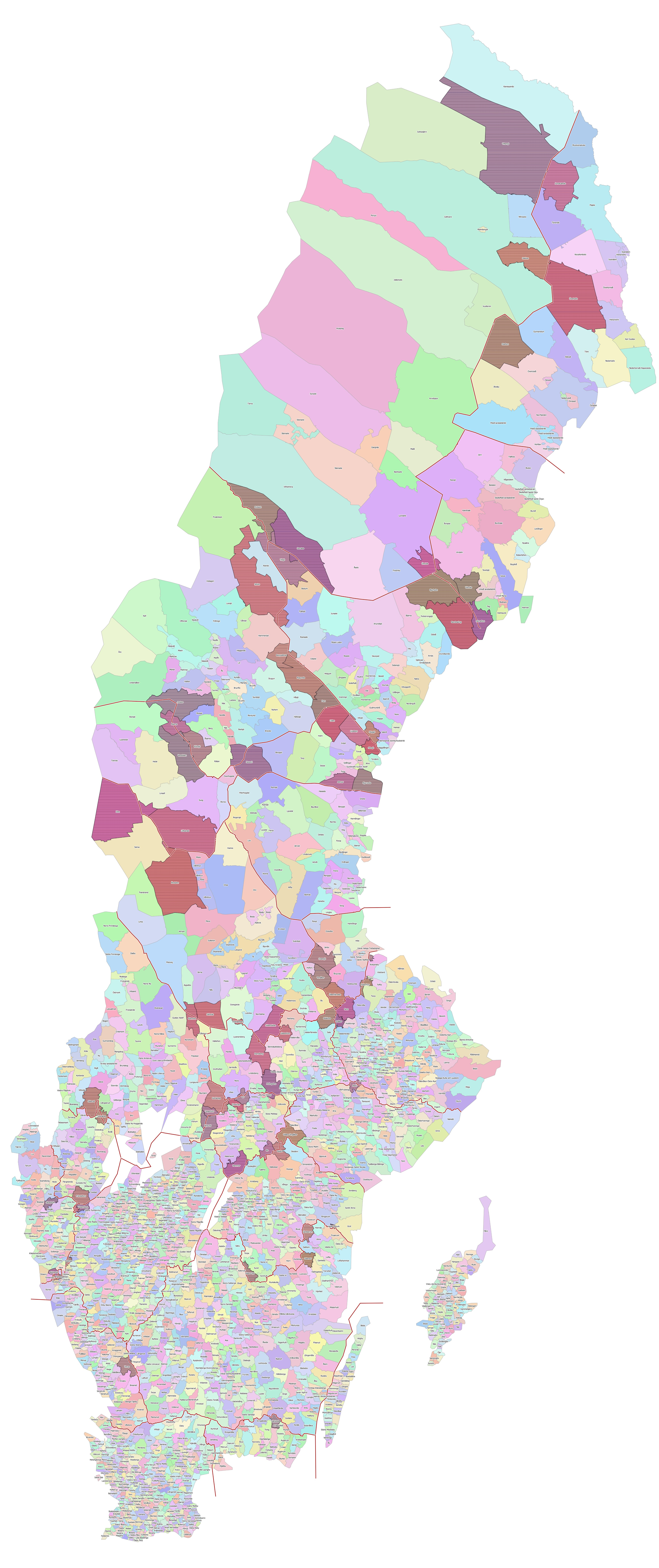
The 2523 registration districts in Sweden

A registration district is, since 1 January 2016, the smallest administrative subdivision for population registration in Sweden (Swedish: folkbokföring), i.e. the civil registration of births, marriages, civil partnerships and deaths, and for the collation of census information.

Geographically, the districts correspond to the parishes of the Church of Sweden of 31 December 1999. About 85% of the old sockens corresponds with the new districts. The civil registration was originally maintained by the Church of Sweden. Since July 1991 it is administered by the Swedish Tax Agency.

== See also ==
- Population registration in Sweden
- Swedish Tax Agency
- Statistics Sweden (SCB)
- Parishes of the Church of Sweden
