= Parishes of the Church of Sweden =

Subdivisions within the Church of Sweden

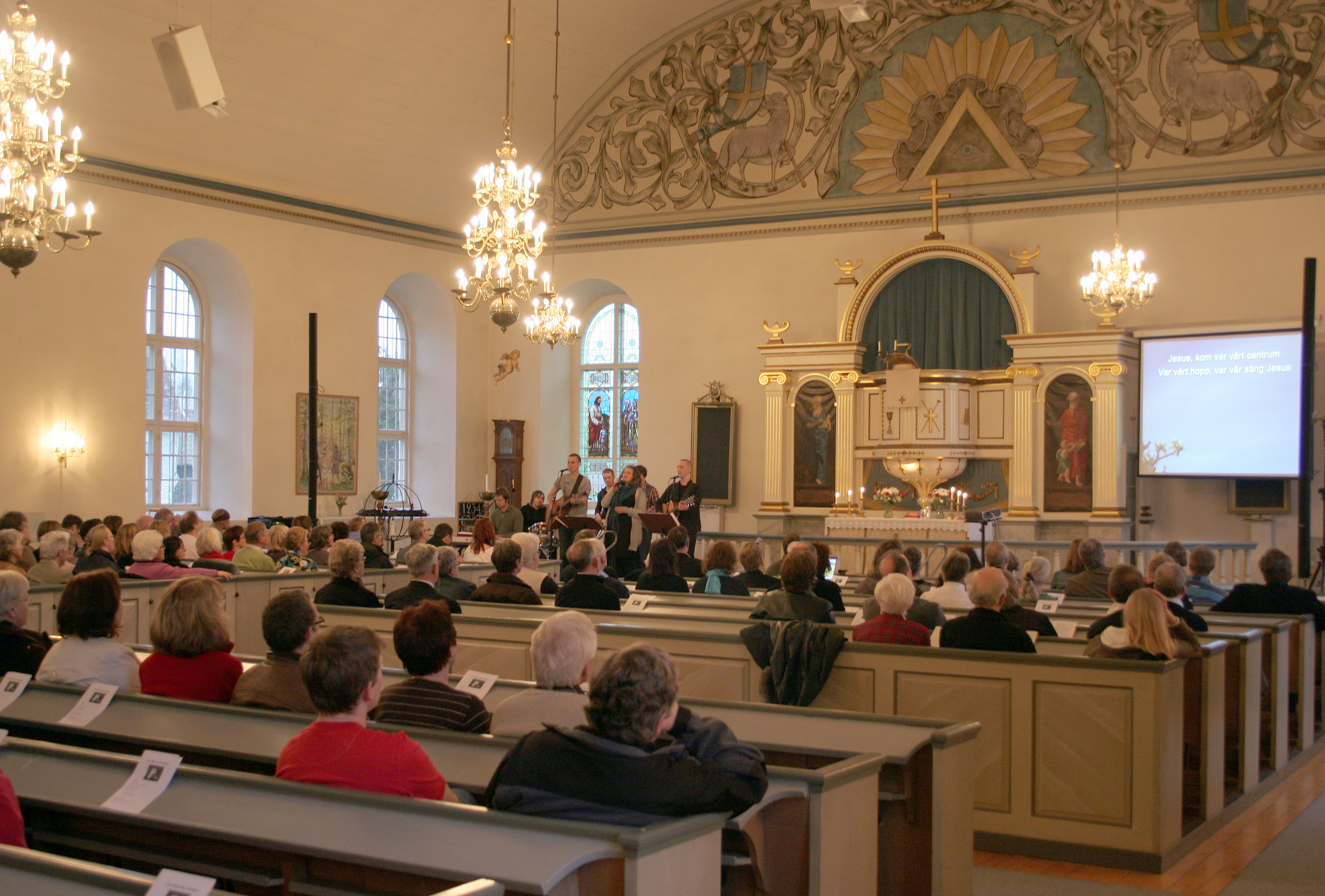
Glimåkra Parish service inside Glimåkra Church.

The Parishes of the Church of Sweden (Swedish: Svenska kyrkans församlingar) are subdivisions within the Church of Sweden that historically were called socken but nowadays are called församling. Similar units were used for municipal (landskommun) and cadastral purposes (jordebokssocknar or jordregistersocknar) until the 20th century.

After the Protestant Reformation in the 16th century the church also became a state church and as such was charged with administrative tasks like as keeping the civic registry. Parishes were also used as cadastral units (jordebokssocknar, later jordregistersocknar), sometimes with slightly different borders. Eventually religious and civil matters became separated in two entities within the same district (in 1863), the religious congregation (församling) and the civil parish or rural municipality (landskommun). The civil parish handled municipal tasks, but the congregation still retained a significant share of influence, including responsibility for schools. The civil parishes were merged to larger municipalities, in most cases in 1952. Some civil parishes remained as separate municipalities until the mergers of 1967–1974 and in a few cases even after that. The cadastral parishes remained until a reform between 1976 and 1995, where they were replaced by the municipalities.

On 1 July 1991, the Swedish Tax Agency took over the remaining duties related to the population register from the parishes.

The Church of Sweden was separated from the Swedish state on 1 January 2000, but its parishes are still used in official statistics. The parishes have seen major geographical changes since that date, so records are kept for both parishes as of 2000 and parishes as of today. However, this ended on 1 January 2016 when Sweden introduced secular registration districts instead.

== See also ==
- List of dioceses, deaneries and parishes of the Church of Sweden
