= Stånga Church =

- Stånga kyrka
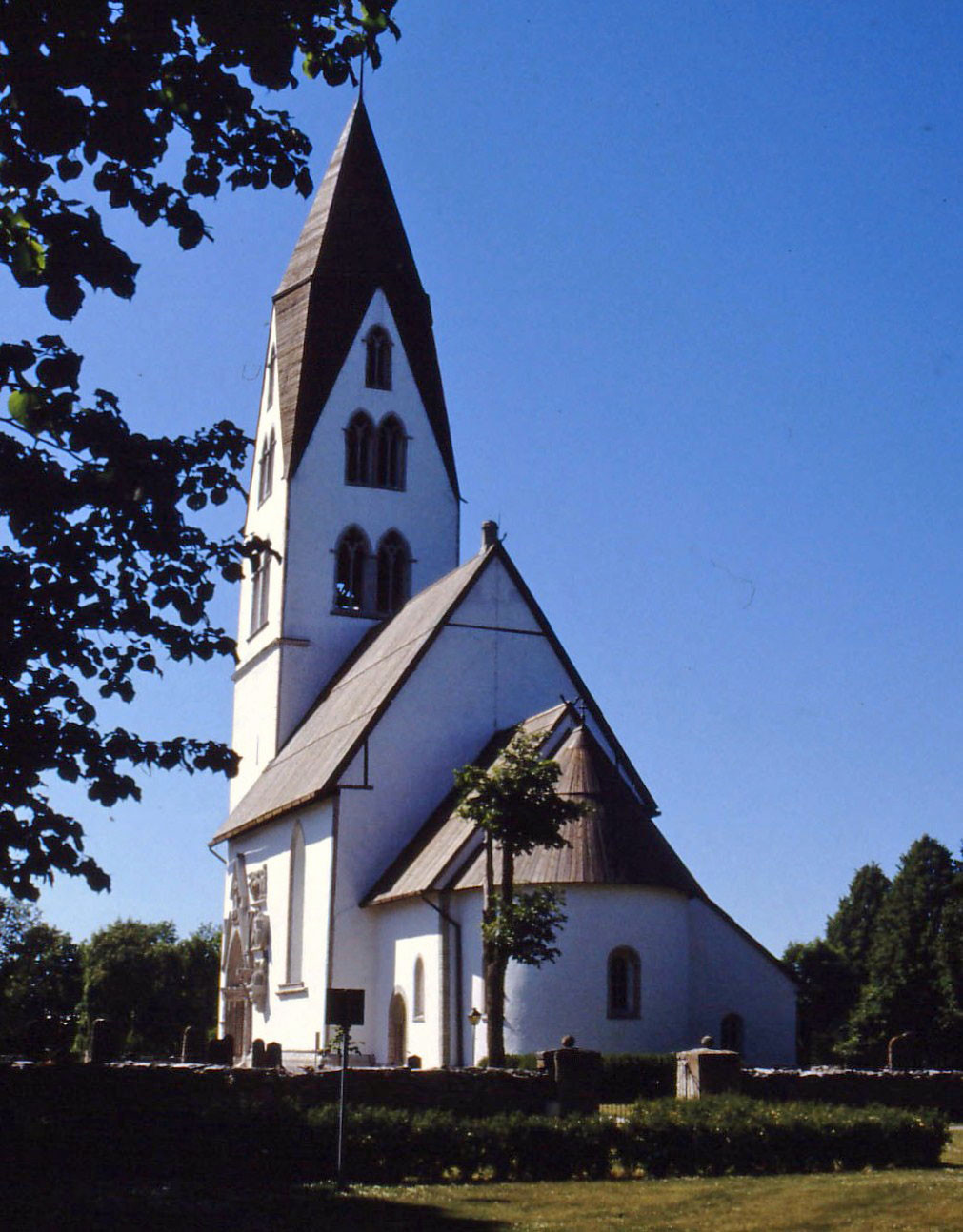
- Stånga Church, view of the exterior

- Location on Gotland Stånga Church (Europe)
- 57°16′59″N 18°27′57″E
- Country: Sweden
- Denomination: Church of Sweden

Stånga Church (Swedish: Stånga kyrka) is a medieval church in Stånga on the Swedish island of Gotland. The site of the church has probably been considered sacred since before the Christianization of Scandinavia.

The oldest parts of the current stone church date from the first half of the 13th century when an earlier wooden church was replaced. The building was substantially altered during the 14th century with the construction of a new nave. Most likely, the intent was to rebuild the entire edifice, but this did not occur for unknown reasons. A group of large Gothic sculptures, currently immured next to the south portal of the church, was possibly intended for a new tower that was never built. These sculptures are among the most unusual Gothic works of art in Sweden.

In the 19th century, when the chancel and the apse of the church had to be replaced due to structural damage, the congregation chose to rebuild them as similarly as possible to the medieval building. The church belongs to the Church of Sweden and lies in the Diocese of Visby.

== Location and surroundings ==
Stånga Church lies in the middle of the old cemetery, which is surrounded by a wall. Two medieval lychgates probably served as entrances from the south and east until the 1860s when they appear to have been demolished. In 1924 an additional, larger cemetery was inaugurated north of the old cemetery. Several archaeological findings in the vicinity of the church, notably clothing objects from the 11th and early 12th centuries such as buckles, buttons and jewellery chains, indicate that the location was already being used as a burial ground prior to the construction of the church. It was probably a pagan sacred site before the Christianization of Scandinavia.

== History ==
Archaeological excavations show that a wooden church was built on the site toward the beginning of the 12th century, possibly even earlier. The wooden church was replaced with a stone church, Romanesque in style, during the first half of the 13th century. This first stone church consisted of a nave and a chancel with an apse. In the middle of the same century, construction started on the present tower which probably replaced an earlier, smaller tower.

In the middle of the 14th century, the nave was demolished to make way for a new and larger Gothic nave. It was constructed by a workshop, known by its notname as Egypticus, that worked on several churches on Gotland. At the same time that the nave was enlarged, the tower was also heightened. This reconstruction scheme appears to have been interrupted for some unknown reason. Several details indicate that ad hoc-solutions, not originally intended, were implemented to finish the work. Most obvious of these is the set of monumental Gothic limestone sculptures immured next to the nave portal in the south wall. These were clearly not intended for their current position. There are also gargoyles, now damaged, immured on each side of the chancel portal. Almost identical gargoyles exist in the churches of Dalhem, Gothem and Öja, where they are placed in the tower. Probably the gargoyles were intended for the tower also in Stånga. Furthermore, the entire nave appears to have been wedged in between the chancel and the tower, implying that a much larger nave was originally planned. It has consequently been suggested that the plans for the rebuilding of the church were originally much more ambitious and that the idea was to replace not only the Romanesque nave but also the chancel and possibly the tower. This would have amounted to the building of an entirely new, much larger Gothic church. The monumental sculptures which now are immured next to the main portal may have been intended for some other part of the projected church. But since the work had to be cancelled, they were simply placed where they could fit in. They may also have been intended for a completely different church, perhaps Källunge Church, on Gotland.

Between 1864 and 1865, the choir and apse were also rebuilt, since they were at risk of collapsing due to structural damage. The congregation chose to rebuild them as closely as possible to their original form, while the old sacristy, north of the chancel, was built to new designs. Therefore only fragments of the Romanesque church remain visible. Apart from the extensive repairs carried out in the 1860s, the church has been renovated and repaired on several occasions. A major renovation was undertaken in 1929–30, led by the architect Erik Fant. In connection with this, archaeological research was conducted on the church. Another large renovation was undertaken 1962–63, this time led by the architect Olle Karth, in order to repair and renew the church. Among other things, the entire exterior was whitewashed anew.

== Architecture ==
=== Exterior ===
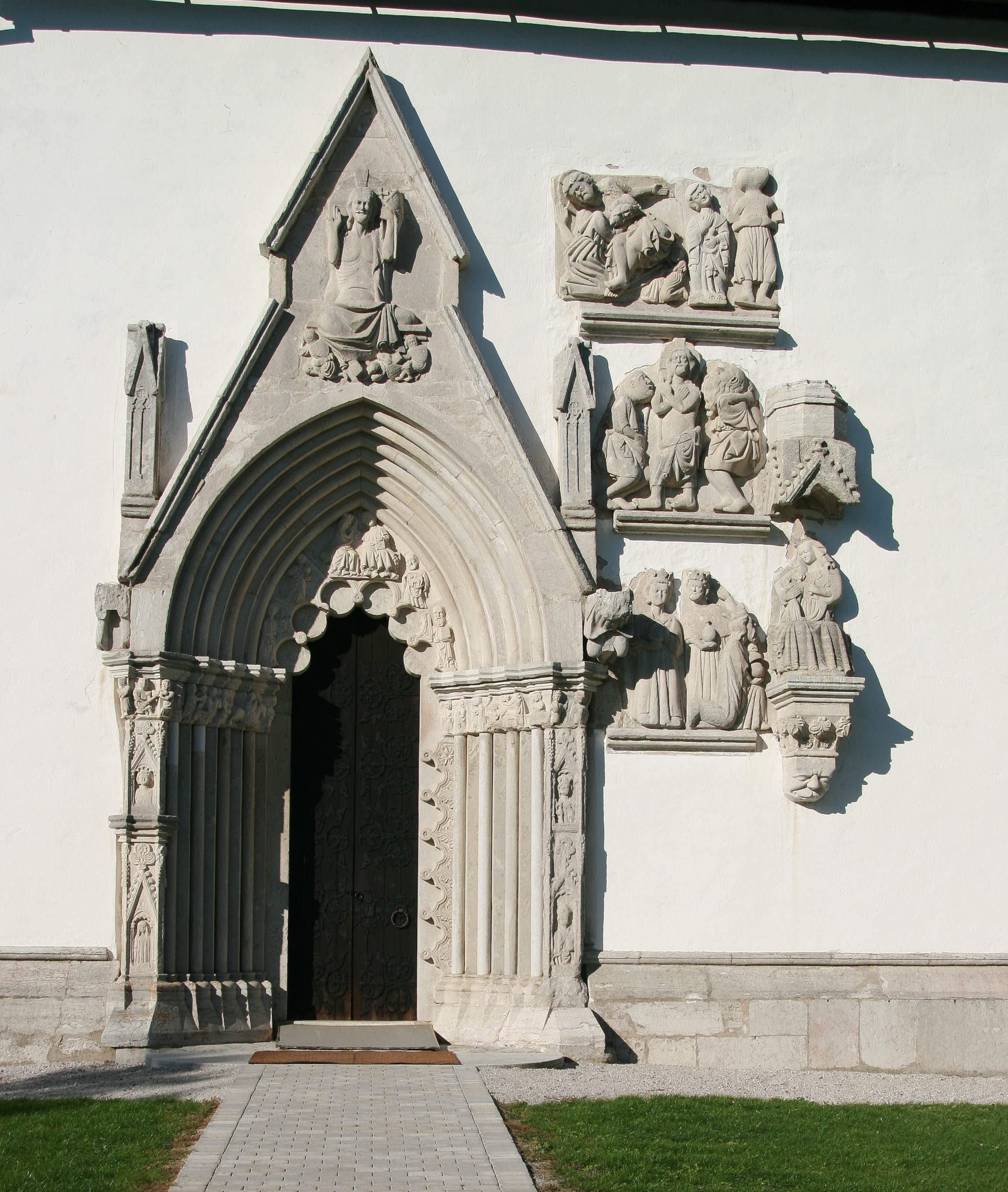
The main portal and adjacent sculptures

The main construction material of Stånga Church is grey limestone with more finely hewn limestone of differing shades as well as sandstone used in some details. Apart from the sculpted elements, the corners and the base of the church, the whole facade is whitewashed. The nave, like many Gotlandic churches, lacks windows facing north. The three windows of the apse and the one in the chancel are round-arched, while the nave has a single, Gothic pointed-arch window, with tracery, that is divided in two by a central limestone post. The tower likewise has a single Gothic window facing south, dating from the re-building during the 14th century. Medieval stained glass almost certainly decorated all the windows of the church originally, but no traces of it survive today.

The five-storey tower is one of the tallest on Gotland, comparable only to the towers of Dalhem, Rone and Öja churches. The church bells hang in the fourth storey. The first storey has two narrow openings, one of which may have been intended as an arrowslit. This would mean that the tower could have served as a refuge for the congregation in times of danger. The second storey has a larger, round-arched opening to the west, which was probably used together with a mechanical winch to bring items into the room behind it. Such an arrangement is known from Etelhem Church. The storage room in the tower may have been used as a tithe barn. Beginning with the fourth storey, there are bell openings. There are two of these on each side of the tower on the fourth floor and similarly on the fifth floor. Finally, above each of these, there is a single opening, one in each direction. Gothic in style, several of them have been repaired and have had their original tracery replaced. The tower is crowned by an octagonal wooden spire. It has also been repaired and renewed occasionally.

The door in the main portal of the church is from the 19th century, but it contains decorative ironwork from an earlier, 14th-century door. There is also an iron rod attached to the door. This is a medieval measuring instrument with an inscription declaring that it is the correct length of one ell. Apart from the main portal, the church has an entrance in the west wall of the tower and one in the south wall of the chancel. The chancel portal, a copy of an earlier portal on the same location, dates from 1864. The tower portal is similar to the chancel portal, but larger. It is made of alternating reddish and grey limestone. It was repaired in the 1890s.

==== Main portal ====
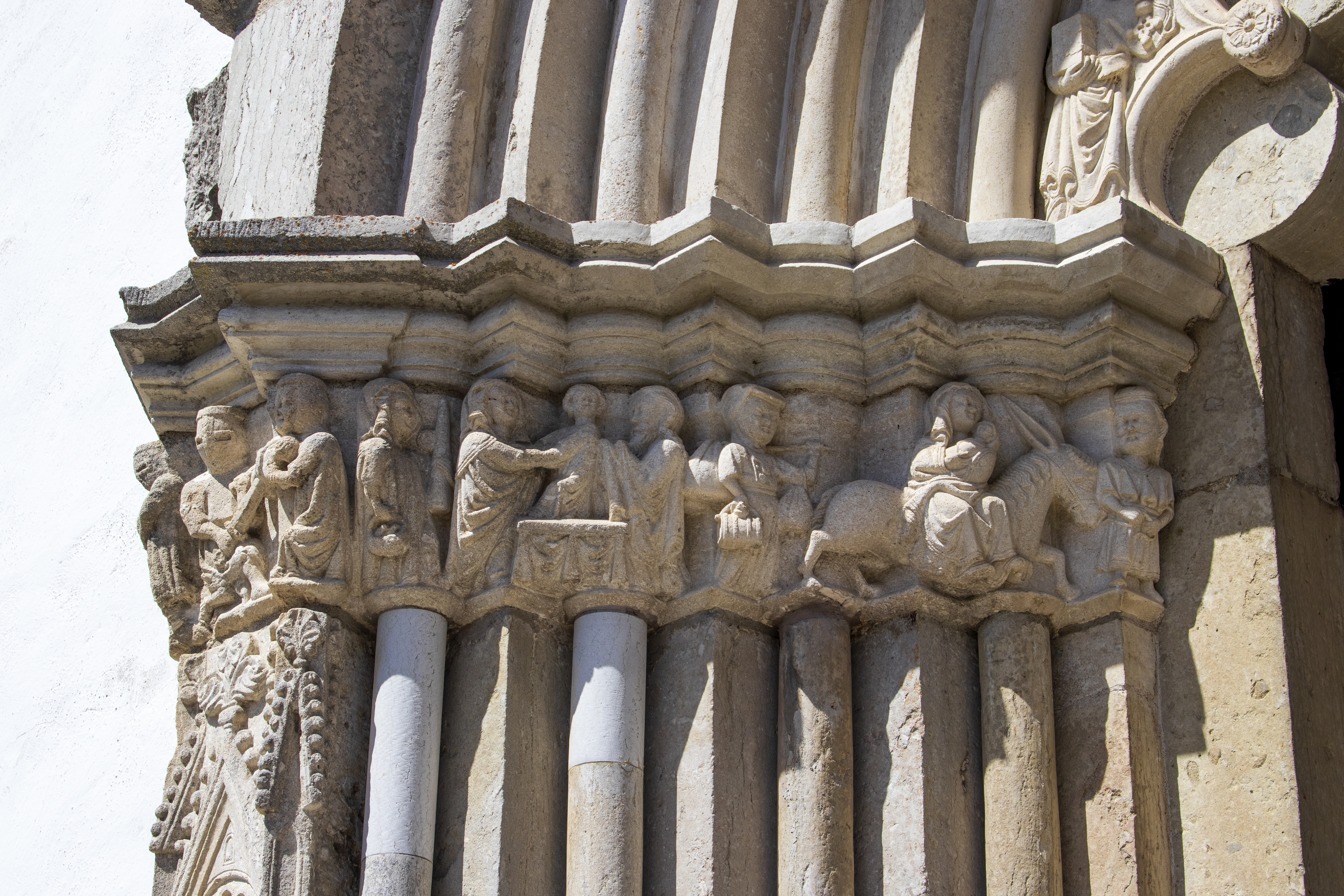
The west capitals of the main portal

The main pointed-arch portal of the church is made of grey limestone. The capitals of the pillars, the outermost posts of the portal, the tympanum and the wimperg are all decorated with sculptures. The tympanum contains a depiction of the Coronation of the Virgin, accompanied by the apostles John, Peter and Paul as well as John the Baptist. The eastern band of capitals, partially damaged, depicts scenes from the life of Mary while the western depict scenes from the childhood of Christ. The rectangular sides of the outer posts of the portal, facing south, are decorated with sculptures of four standing figures, probably saints. They are framed by aediculae. The wimperg, flanked by two pinnacles, contains a sculpture of the Resurrection of Jesus.

The decoration of the portal and the adjacent sculptures date from the same time, around 1345–1360, and were probably made by the same workshop, but by different individual sculptors.

==== Monumental sculptures ====
Just east of the main portal several monumental limestone sculptures are immured in the church facade. Together with the decorated portal they constitute "one of the most remarkable ecclesiastical monuments on Gotland". The Swedish National Heritage Board describes them as "one of the most unusual works of art from the Middle Ages in [Sweden]". In their size and monumentality, the sculptures are unlike any other Gothic sculptures from the Nordic countries. These sculptures appear to be an incomplete set meant to display the history of the childhood and Passion of Christ. Additional sculptures were most probably planned but never executed. As noted above, the placement of the sculptures is equally not as originally intended. Apart from the awkward placement, it has been shown that they are anchored quite shallowly in the wall, further indicating that their placement is secondary. From bottom to top, the sculptures depict the Adoration of the Magi next to a sculpture of Mary and the infant Christ. Above this is a scene showing the Flagellation of Christ. The subject of the top sculpture is the Descent from the Cross.

=== Interior ===
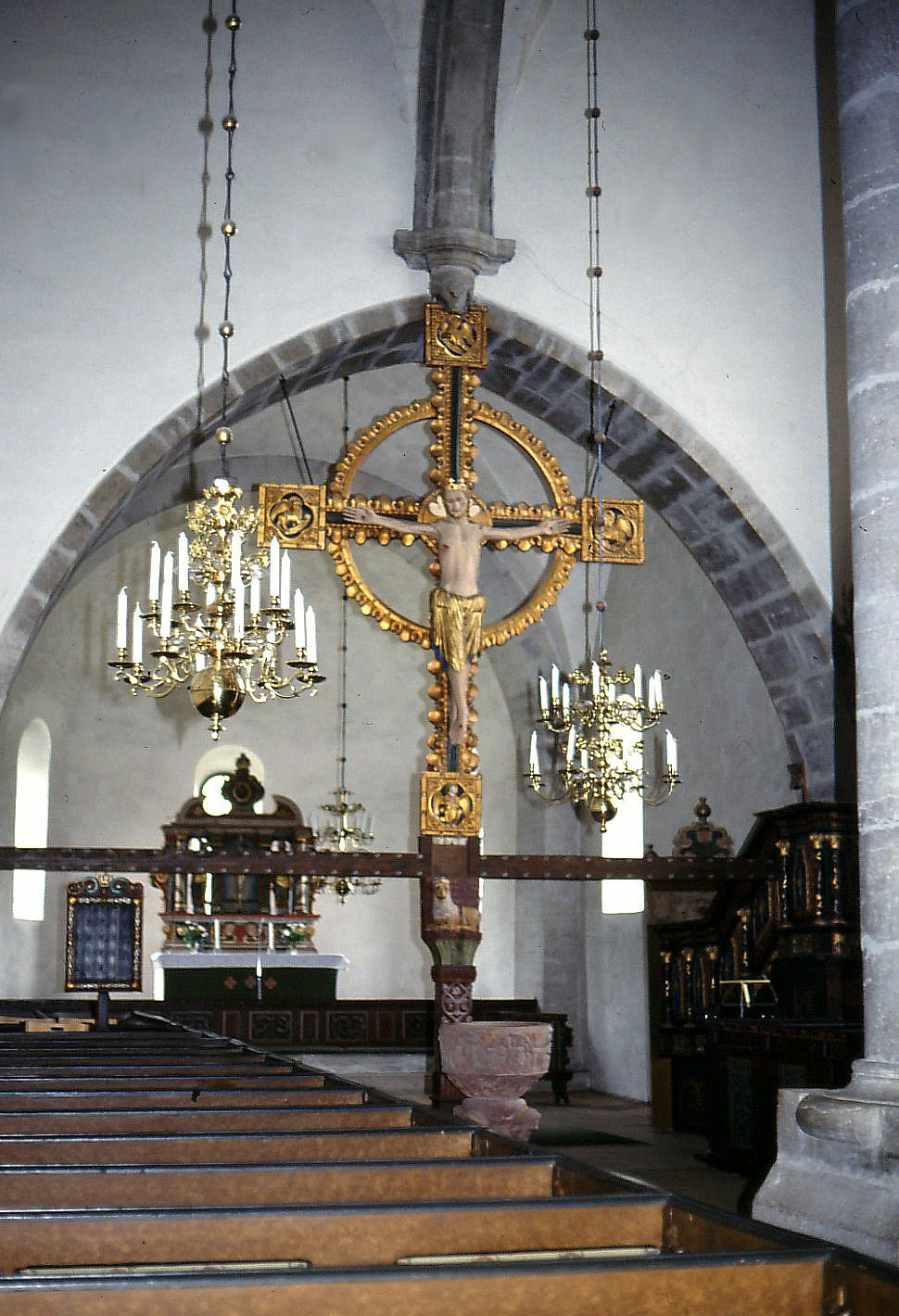
The interior, viewed towards the chancel, with the rood cross hanging in the chancel arch

The nave is divided into four bays, its vaults supported by a single pillar that is placed in the middle of the church. A wide chancel arch divides it from the chancel and the apse. Fragmentary remains of murals exist in the apse and in the ground floor of the tower.

Among the furnishings, the baptismal font is the oldest, dating from the late 12th century. It is a richly decorated font made by the Romanesque sculptor known as Hegvald. Considered one of the best preserved fonts attributed to the sculptor, it is stylistically close to the baptismal fonts, also by Hegvald, in När and Vänge churches. The reliefs on the sides of the basin depict scenes from the New Testament, but also beasts and human figures.

The Romanesque rood cross is made of oak which has been painted and gilded. Dating to around 1250, it is relatively complete and well-preserved with respect to other rood crosses, and it is still supported by its original pedestal, which is unusual. It depicts Christ on a ringed cross, the ends of which have the symbols of the Four Evangelists.

A 15th-century wooden crucifix has been incorporated into the Baroque altarpiece which was made in the late 17th century in Burgsvik on Gotland. The wooden pulpit bears the date 1723 and the monogram of Frederick I of Sweden. The pews are probably from 1693.

== Current use and heritage status ==
Stånga Church belongs to Stånga-Burs parish within Sudertredingens kontrakt, (Note: A "kontrakt" within the Church of Sweden is approximately equivalent to a rural deanery.) itself a part of the Diocese of Visby within the Church of Sweden. Stånga Church is an ecclesiastical monument, number 21300000002847 (sub-number: 21400000444078) in the buildings database of the Swedish National Heritage Board.

== Bibliography ==
- Andrén, Anders (2017). Det Medeltida Gotland. En arkeologisk guidebok [Medieval Gotland. An archaeological guidebook] (in Swedish) (2 ed.). Lund: Historiska Media. ISBN 978-91-7545-476-4.
- Jacobsson, Britta; Johansson, Eva; Johansson, Per; Andersson, Rolf (1990). Våra kyrkor [Our churches]. Västervik: Klarkullens förlag AB. ISBN 91-971561-08.
- Lagerlöf, Erland; Stolt, Bengt (1968). Stånga kyrka (PDF). Sveriges kyrkor, konsthistoriskt inventarium (in Swedish and English). Vol. 125. Stockholm: Almqvist & Wiksell. pp. 89–165.
- Lagerlöf, Erland (1975). Gotländsk stenskulptur från gotiken. En stenhuggarverkstad på 1300-talet [Gothic stone sculpture from Gotland. A stone sculptor workshop from the 14th century] (in Swedish). Stockholm: Rabén & Sjögren. ISBN 91-29-43995-7.
- Lagerlöf, Erland; Svahnström, Gunnar (1991). Gotlands kyrkor [Churches of Gotland] (in Swedish) (4th ed.). Stockholm: Rabén & Sjögren. ISBN 91-29-61598-4.
- Söderberg, Bengt G. (1960). "Reflexioner kring Stånga kyrkas sydfasad" [Reflections on the south facade of Stånga Church] (PDF). Fornvännen. Journal of Swedish Antiquarian Research: 41–44. ISSN 0015-7813.
