= Egby Church =

- Egby kyrka
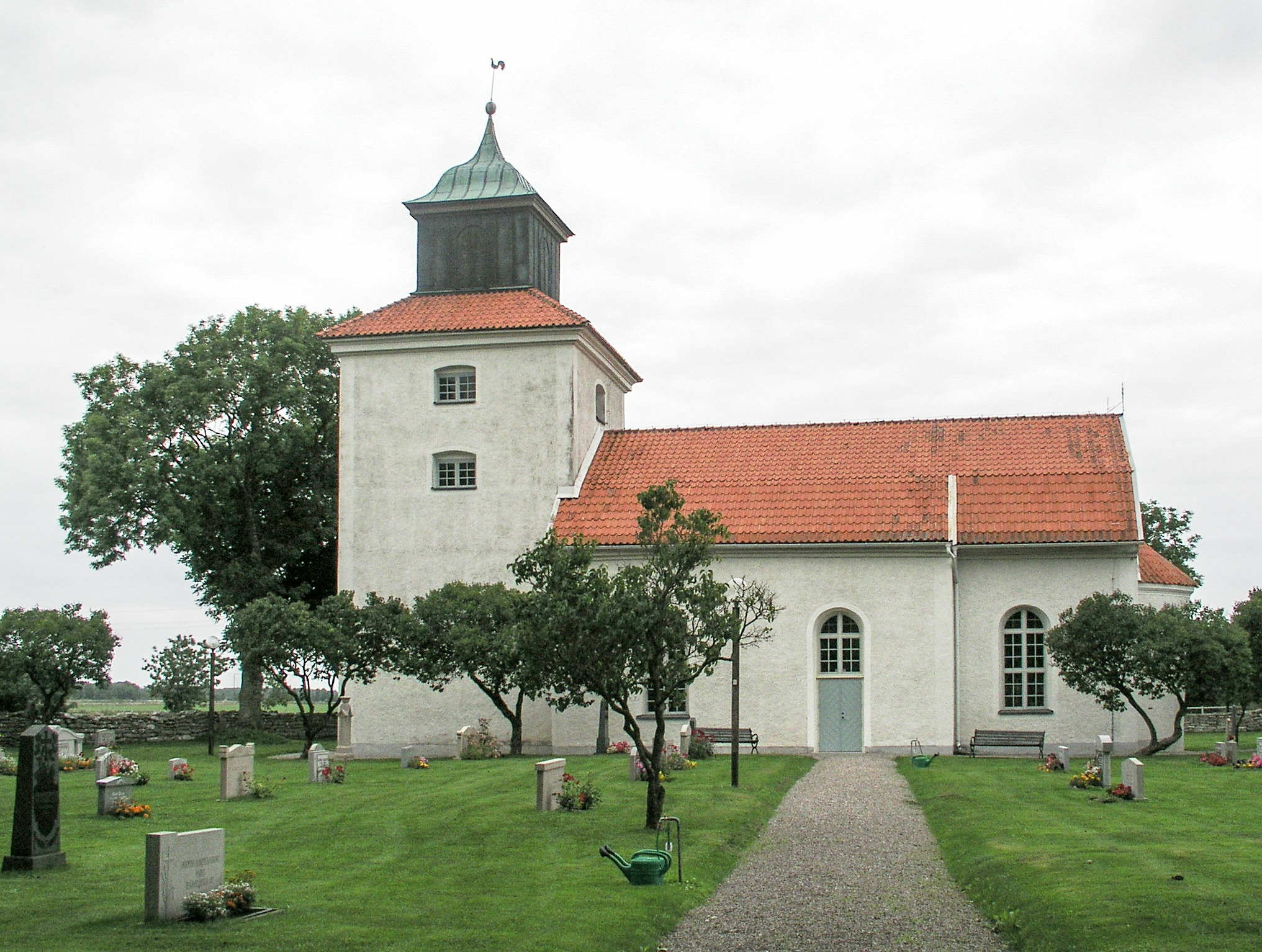
- Egby Church, view of the exterior

- Location within Kalmar
- 56°52′24″N 16°49′14″E
- Country: Sweden
- Denomination: Church of Sweden

Administration
- Diocese: Växjö

Egby Church (Swedish: Egby kyrka) is a Lutheran church on the Swedish island Öland, in the Baltic Sea. It belongs to the Diocese of Växjö.

== History and architecture ==
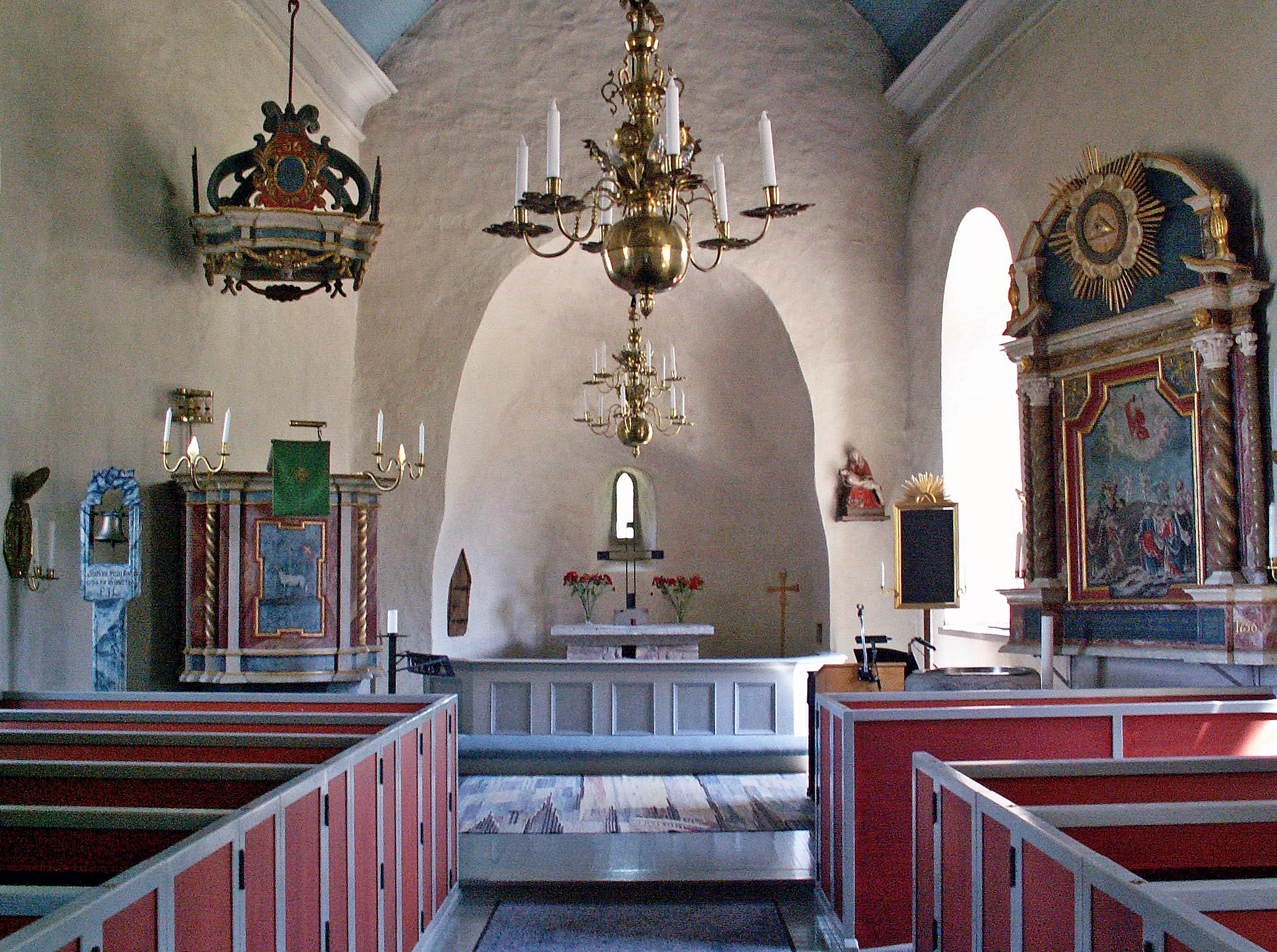
Interior view towards the apse

Egby Church is the smallest church on Öland. The present stone church was probably preceded by a wooden church. The oldest parts of the present building are the apse, parts of the choir and the southern wall of the nave, dating from the 12th century. The church was rebuilt during the late 12th and early 13th century into a fortified church. At the middle of the 13th century, the church porch was probably also added. The sacristy is furthermore medieval. The church was quite heavily rebuilt during a renovation which began in 1817 and which wasn't finished until the 1830s. During this time the church tower was added (1818) and the interior redecorated. The church was renovated in 1959. Easily visible from sea, the church is a known landmark for mariners.

The church contains a medieval altar and a baptismal font dating from the 12th century in the style of Hegvald. The altarpiece and pulpit are from the mid-18th century and made by master carpenter Nils Lindman.
