= Sonja Åkesson =

Swedish writer and artist (1926–1977)

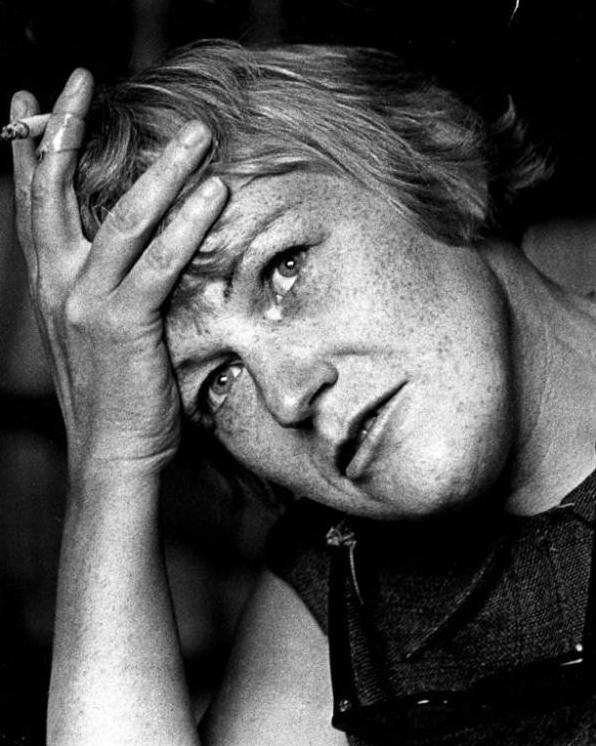
- Sonja Åkesson, 1968.
- Born: 19 April 1926; Buttle, Gotland
- Died: 5 May 1977 (aged 51)
- Occupation: Poet
- Known for: Feminism

Sonja Åkesson (19 April 1926 – 5 May 1977) was a Swedish poet, writer, and artist born in Buttle, Gotland.

== Life ==
Sonja Åkesson first discovered her talent for writing at 28 after moving to Stockholm, after her divorce from Nils Westberg, a carpenter. They had two children at the time of the divorce and Sonja was expecting a baby (not her husband’s). The baby died from leukemia at the age of two.

In 1956, Sonja married Bo Holmberg and had her fourth child, Mikael. The following year she published her first collection of poems: Situationer ("Situations"). In 1963 she became a household name in Sweden after publishing Husfrid. She became known for her distinct style of writing, describing daily life and commenting on society. The feminist movement embraced Åkesson's work and often cited it. The most famous of her poems is probably "äktenskapsfrågan" (the question of marriage). This is often referred to as "vara vit mans slav" (to be the slave of a white man) as this is repeated throughout the poem.

After nine years of marriage, she divorced Bo Holmberg in 1965. She married Jarl Hammarberg, a Swedish artist and poet, and gave birth to her fifth child, Gertie. Sonja Åkesson moved to Halmstad in the 1970s after suffering from mental illness, and in 1977 she died from liver cancer.

== Works ==
Her works include:

=== Poetry ===
- Situationer (1957)
- Glasveranda (1959)
- Husfrid (1963)
- Pris (1968)
- Sagan om Siv (1974)

=== Prose ===
- Skvallerspegel (1960)
- Leva livet (1961)
- Efter balen (1962)

Her manuscripts and other papers are held within the Women’s History Collections, University of Gothenburg, Sweden.
