= Buttle Church =

- Buttle kyrka
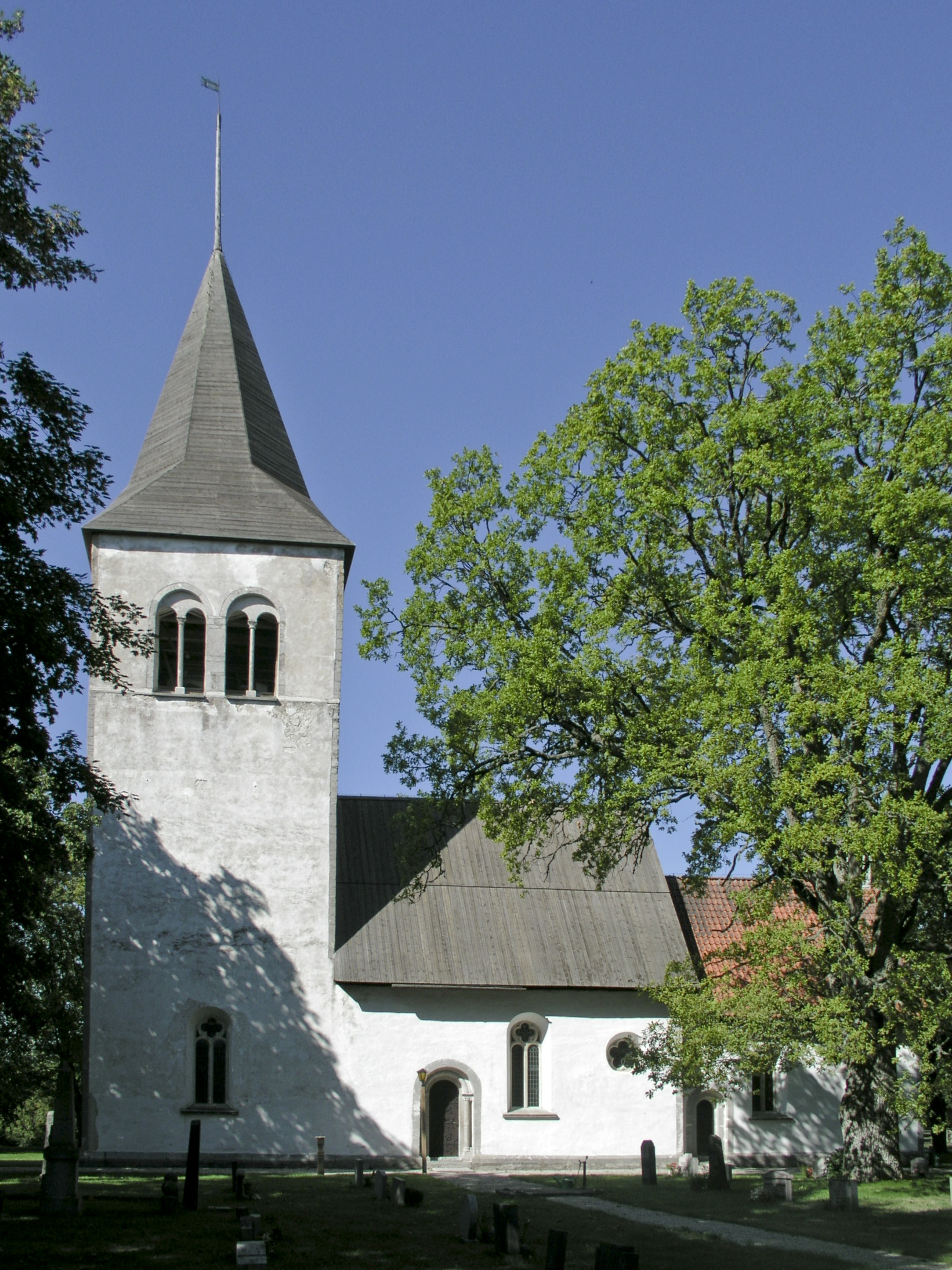
- Buttle Church, view

- Location on Gotland
- 57°24′10″N 18°31′48″E
- Country: Sweden
- Denomination: Church of Sweden

Administration
- Diocese: Visby

Buttle Church (Swedish: Buttle kyrka) is a medieval church in Buttle on the Swedish island of Gotland. It is one of the more well-preserved Romanesque churches on Gotland, and contains both a number of medieval furnishings as well as medieval murals. Buttle Church belongs to the Diocese of Visby of the Church of Sweden.

== History and architecture ==
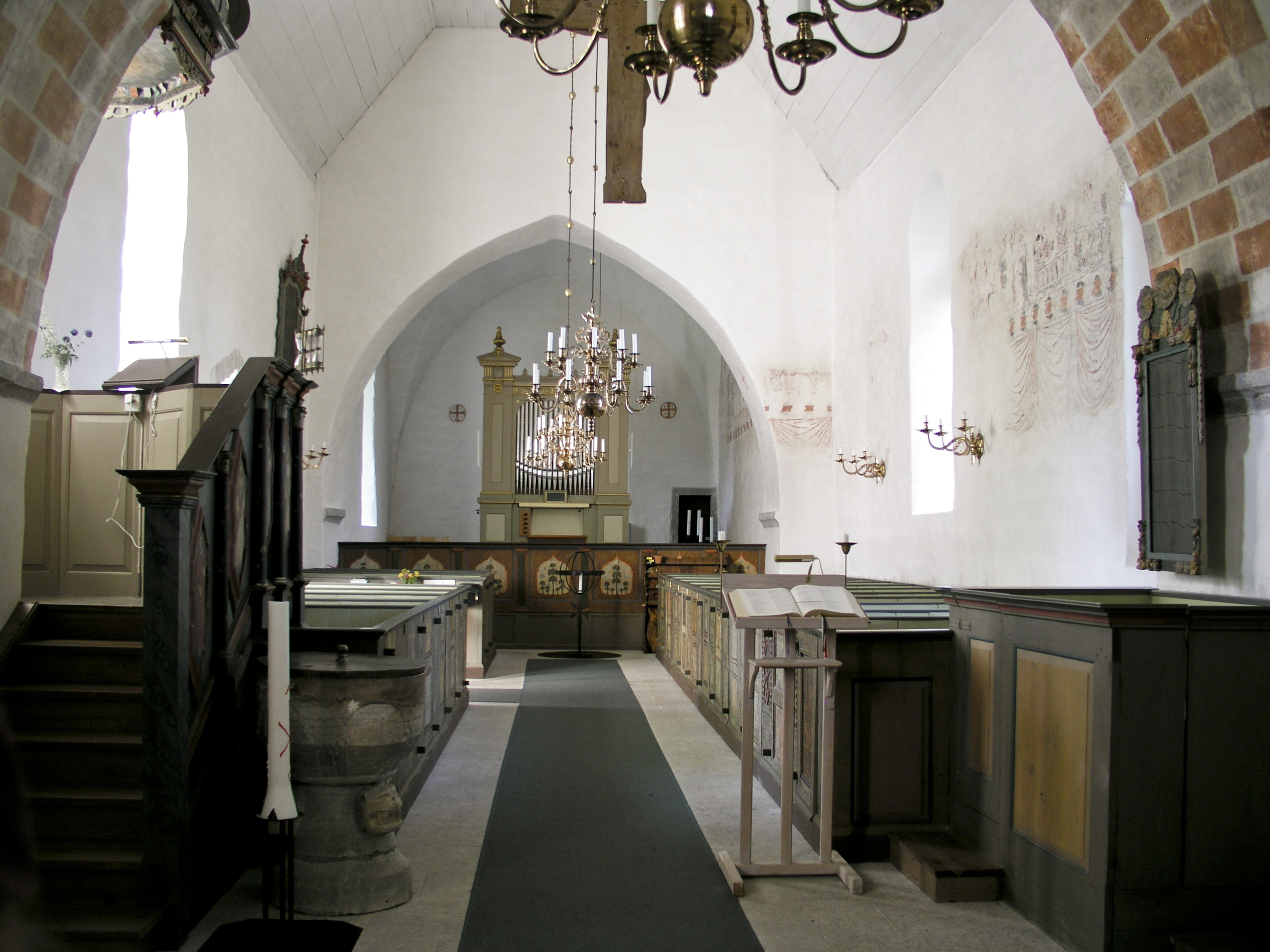
Buttle Church interior

Buttle Church is one of the more well-preserved Romanesque churches on Gotland. The oldest parts are the western part of the choir and the nave, dating from the second half of the 12th century. The tower was added circa 1220. An original apse was pulled down during the middle of the 14th century and replaced by the present structure with a straight east end, in Gothic style. The only later additions are the windows of the nave, which were made in 1882-83.

Inside, the church is decorated with medieval murals. In the nave, a damaged frieze displaying the Passion of Christ can be seen, while in the tower base there are a set of paintings depicting Saint George and the Dragon, Saint Martin of Tours and a scene in which souls are being weighed. All the paintings in the church have been attributed to the Master of the Passion of Christ (Passionsmästaren) or his workshop.

The church retains several medieval furnishings. The triumphal cross is one of the earliest of its kind on Gotland, dating from the end of the 12th century. It was probably made by a local artist but shows influences from German art from the period. The altarpiece is also medieval, from the 15th century, and still in its original place. The altarpiece displays carved wooden figures depicting the crucifixion and a number of saints. It was renovated in 1956-57. The baptismal font is also noteworthy, from the middle of the 13th century. Its base is decorated with sculpted heads of humans and beasts. The pews are in a vernacular Baroque style. In the 1950s they were restored to their original colour scheme. They were probably decorated by the same artist who worked in Vänge Church.

The church today belongs to the Church of Sweden and lies within the Diocese of Visby.
