= Guldrupe =

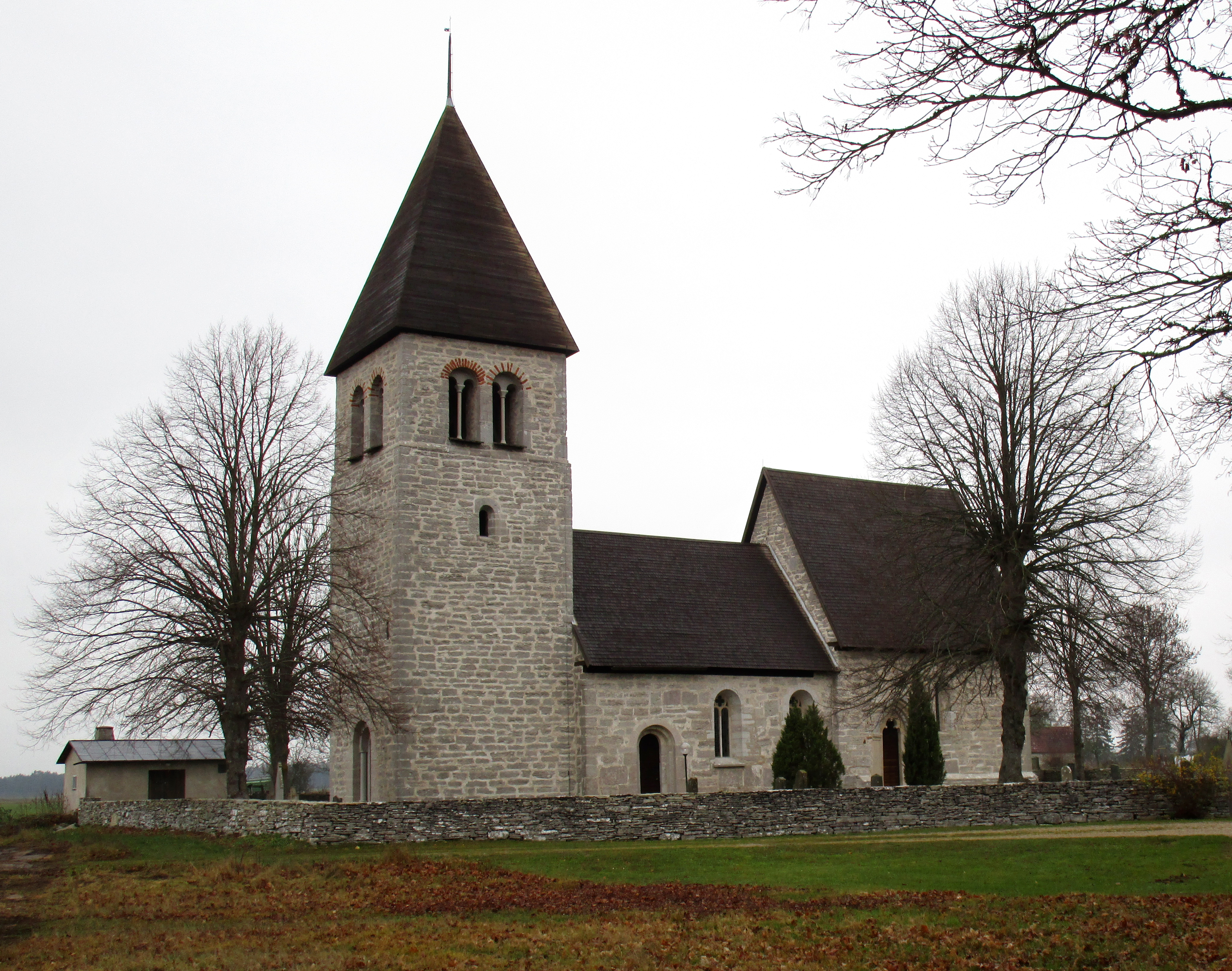
- Guldrupe Church

- Location within Gotland
- Coordinates: 57°25′49″N 18°25′35″E
- Country: Sweden
- Province: Gotland
- County: Gotland County
- Municipality: Gotland Municipality

Area
  - Total: 15.88 km^{2} (6.13 sq mi)

Population (2014)
  - Total: 105
- Time zone: UTC+1 (CET)
  - Summer (DST): UTC+2 (CEST)

Guldrupe (Swedish pronunciation: [ˈɡɵ̂lːdˌrʉːpɛ]) is a populated area (socken), on the Swedish island of Gotland. It comprises the same area as the administrative Guldrupe District, established on 1 January 2016.

== Geography ==
Guldrupe is situated in the central part of Gotland. The medieval Guldrupe Church is located in the socken. As of 2019, Guldrupe Church belongs to Vänge parish in Romaklosters diocese, along with the churches in Vänge, Buttle, Sjonhem, Viklau and Halla.
