= Broe helmet =

Iron Age helmet

- 1969 illustration of the Broe helmet
- Material: Iron, bronze, garnets
- Discovered: c. 1904; Broe, Högbro, Halla, Gotland, Sweden
- Present location: Statens historiska museum, Stockholm
- Registration: 12,291

The Broe helmet (also known as the Broa helmet) is a decorated iron helmet from around the Vendel Period. Discovered around 1904 in a cremation grave in Broe, a farm on the Swedish island Gotland, it was located alongside other items including fragments of shields, weapons, bridles, and game pieces. Due to its extremely fragmented condition, only an incomplete reconstruction of the helmet is possible, but it appears to have been an example of the "crested helmets" that flourished in England and Scandinavia from the sixth through eleventh centuries.

A full speculative reconstruction was attempted in 1969, suggesting a cap made in segments, with brow and nose-to-nape bands; pieces of metal attached to the brow band likely provided neck, cheek, and face protection. The nose-to-nape band was decorated with ornamental bronze sheeting, and an eyebrow piece, which survives in full and also featured animal-head terminals, was inlaid with strips of a material such as silver. This appearance is generally consistent with the contemporaneous Vendel XIV helmet, which the Broe example may have looked somewhat similar to.

The helmet is hard to date by itself, but the style and type of the grave goods suggests a date in the second half of the 7th century AD. This is consistent with the Vendel XIV grave, which is variously dated between 520 and 625 AD, and shares similarities with the Broe grave even beyond the helmets; in particular, decorated iron fragments from the graves share an identical design.

== Description ==
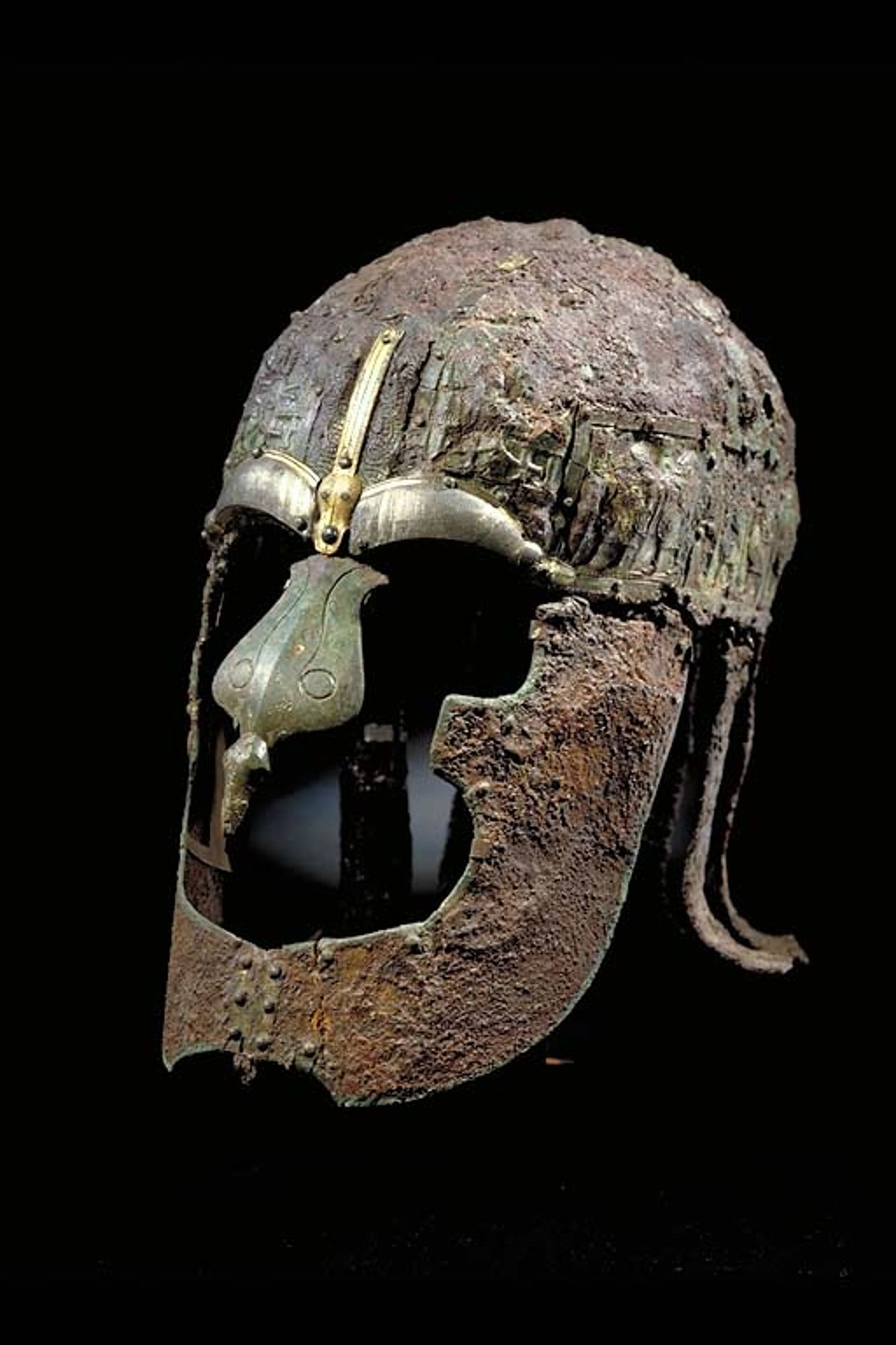
The Broe helmet shares similarities with the Vendel XIV helmet.

The Broe helmet survives in a fragmentary state, with a speculative artistic reconstruction. When whole, it included an iron cap, likely constructed in sections, with both a brow band and a nose-to-nape band. The latter band, to which may belong a fragment with traces of ornamental bronze sheeting, terminated above the eyebrows with an animal head, its eyes formed with inlaid garnets. A fragment of the nose-to-nape band retains an animal-head impression that does not match the surviving head, suggesting that a second animal head terminal adorned the rear of the helmet. (Note: It is unclear from the surviving fragments which animal head went on the front of the helmet, and which went on the rear. Either the nose-to-nape band fragment with the impression went on the front, and the surviving animal head on the back, or the band fragment went on the back, and the surviving animal head on the front.) Strips of iron hanging from the brow band provided neck and cheek protection. The one surviving cheek piece is fragmentary, but appears to have extended deeply. Further strips extended from the nose-to-nape band to cover the nose, and encircled the eyes to protect the face. Over the eyes ran an ornamental eyebrow piece, made of iron inlaid with thin strips of another material—possibly silver—and terminating in an animal head on either side.

The helmet may once have appeared similar, in some respects, to the Vendel XIV helmet. Both had deep hinged plates protecting the cheeks and neck, a flat crest terminating in animal heads, and ornamented eyebrows. The Broe example is too fragmentary, however, for its exact design to be determined.

== Discovery ==
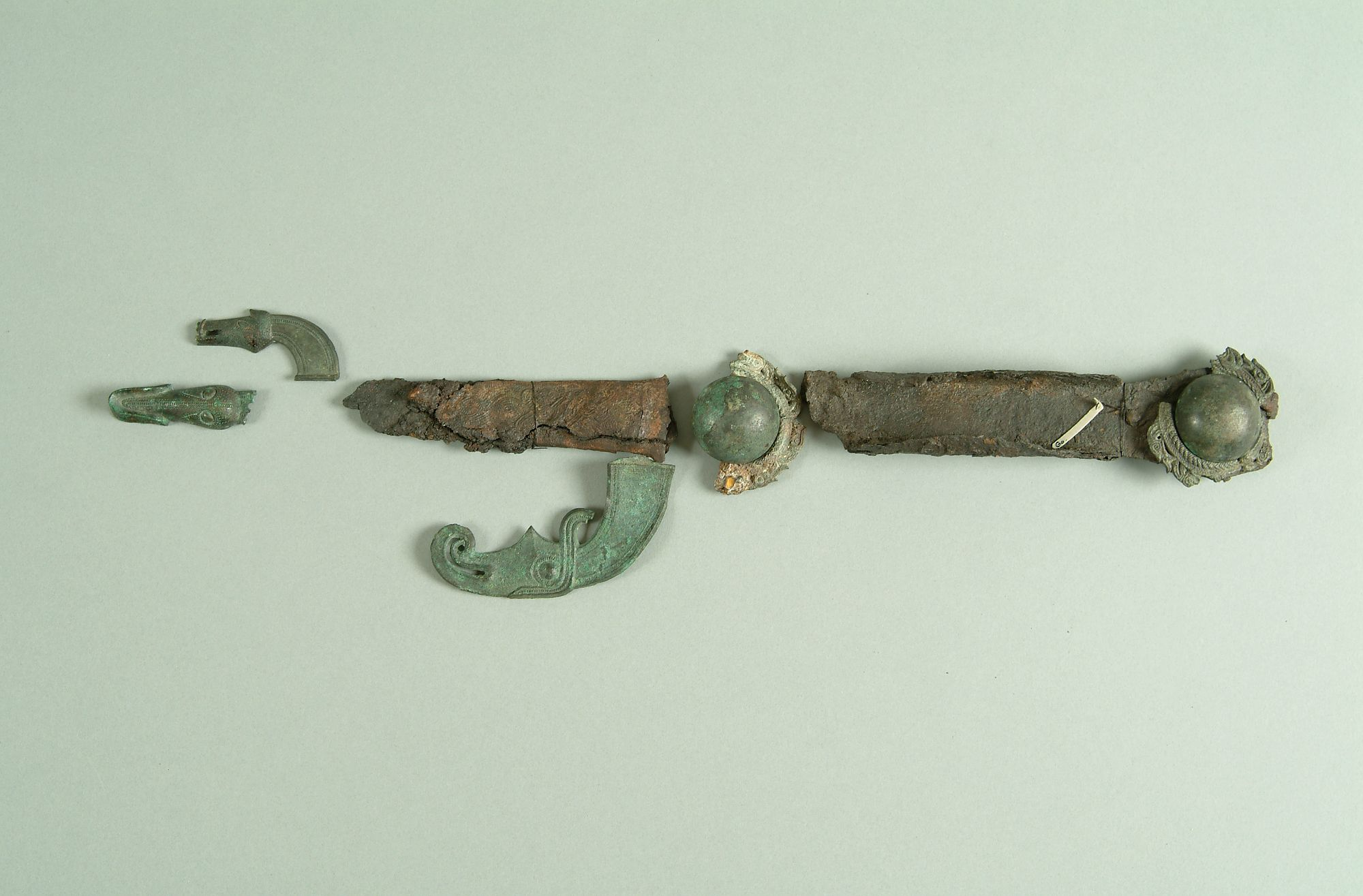
Shield fittings from the Broe grave

The helmet was discovered around 1904 in a grave in Broe, a farm in the community of Högbro, located within Halla socken in the central region of the Swedish island Gotland. The grave was uncovered while digging a garden; the excavation measured approximately 0.30 metres (1 ft) in depth, and half a kappland (about 154 square metres [1,660 sq ft]) in area. All but one object, a round bronze clasp with three animal heads, was damaged by fire.

In addition to the clasp with three animal heads, bronze objects from the grave included an inlaid round clasp, two ring-shaped items with animal-head decoration, parts of handle to a ring-sword, seven large hemispherical rivet heads, four smaller rivets, and around 35 types of fragmentary strap fittings, several with animal ornamentation; two of these were iron with bronze ornamentation, and five were hat shaped. Several of the fittings, and perhaps the ring-shaped items, belonged to shield handles. Iron objects included three two-edged swords, two wide and four slim one-edged swords, eight spearheads, four shield bosses, several shield handles, four bridles, a knife, a pair of scissors, and several fittings—including some for the edges of shields—in addition to the helmet. Non-metal objects from the grave included pieces of a green glass cup, mostly melted away, seven fragments of bone game pieces, and some burnt pieces of bone, possibly from a horse.

The items were acquired by the Statens historiska museum in 1904, where they were collectively given the inventory number 12,291. In 1907 the finds were published along with sketched illustrations of some of the items in Månadsblad, a monthly publication of the Royal Swedish Academy of Letters, History and Antiquities. Illustrations of a number of the finds, including a speculative reconstruction of the helmet, were published in volume II of Birger Nerman's book on the Vendel Period finds from Gotland, Die Vendelzeit Gotlands—followed six years later by volume I, the textual companion.

== Typology ==
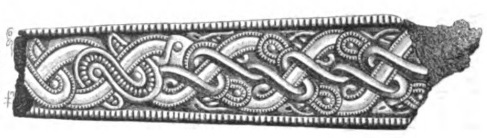
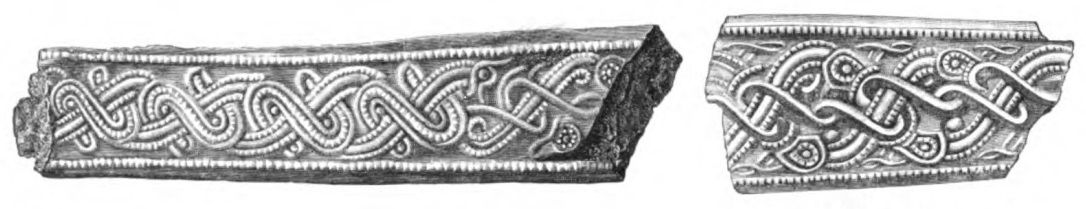
Ornamented iron fragments from the graves at Broe (top) and Vendel XIV (bottom) share the same design.

Difficult to date by itself, the Broe helmet and finds from the same site appear characteristic of early Migration Period style. Certain features of the Broe helmet, particularly its eyebrow piece, are similar to helmets and fragments found in Gotland, such as the Lokrume helmet fragment, and on the mainland, in Uppland. In particular, the Broe helmet's similarities to the Vendel XIV helmet, which has been variously dated from 520 to 625 AD, may suggest a comparable date; ornamented iron fragments in each burial, unrelated to the helmets, even bear the same stamped design. Other objects from the Broe grave, likewise, suggest a date in the second half of the 6th century AD.

The Broe helmet fits into the corpus of "crested helmets" known in Northern Europe from the 6th through the 11th centuries AD. Such helmets were characterized by a rounded cap and usually a prominent nose-to-nape crest. Other than a Viking Age fragment found in Kyiv, they uniformly originate from England or Scandinavia. More than half of the known examples are from Sweden; up to twenty are from Gotland alone, although these were typically found in cremation burials and comprise only a fragment or two.

== Gallery ==
Fragments of the Broe helmet
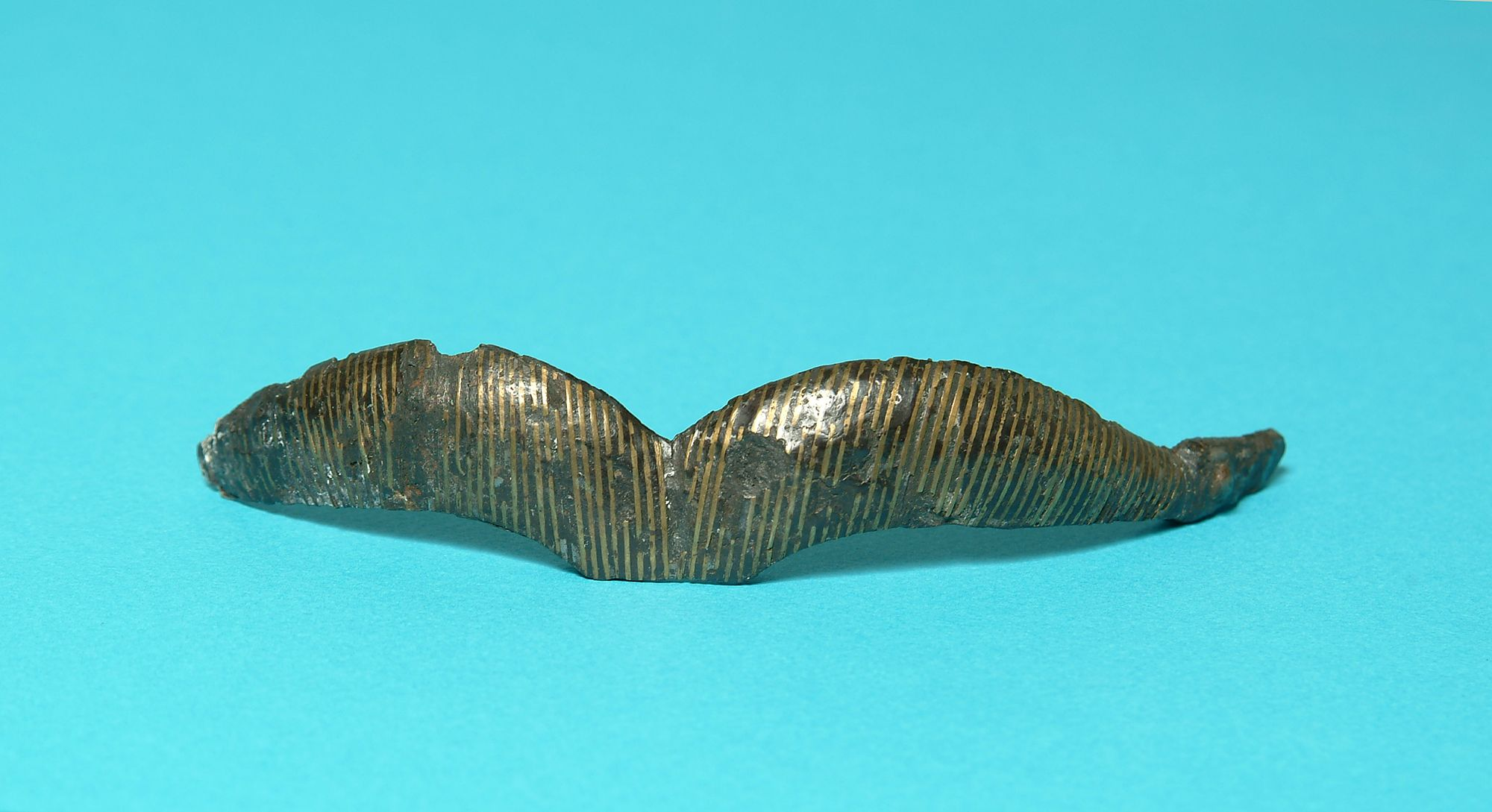
Eyebrow

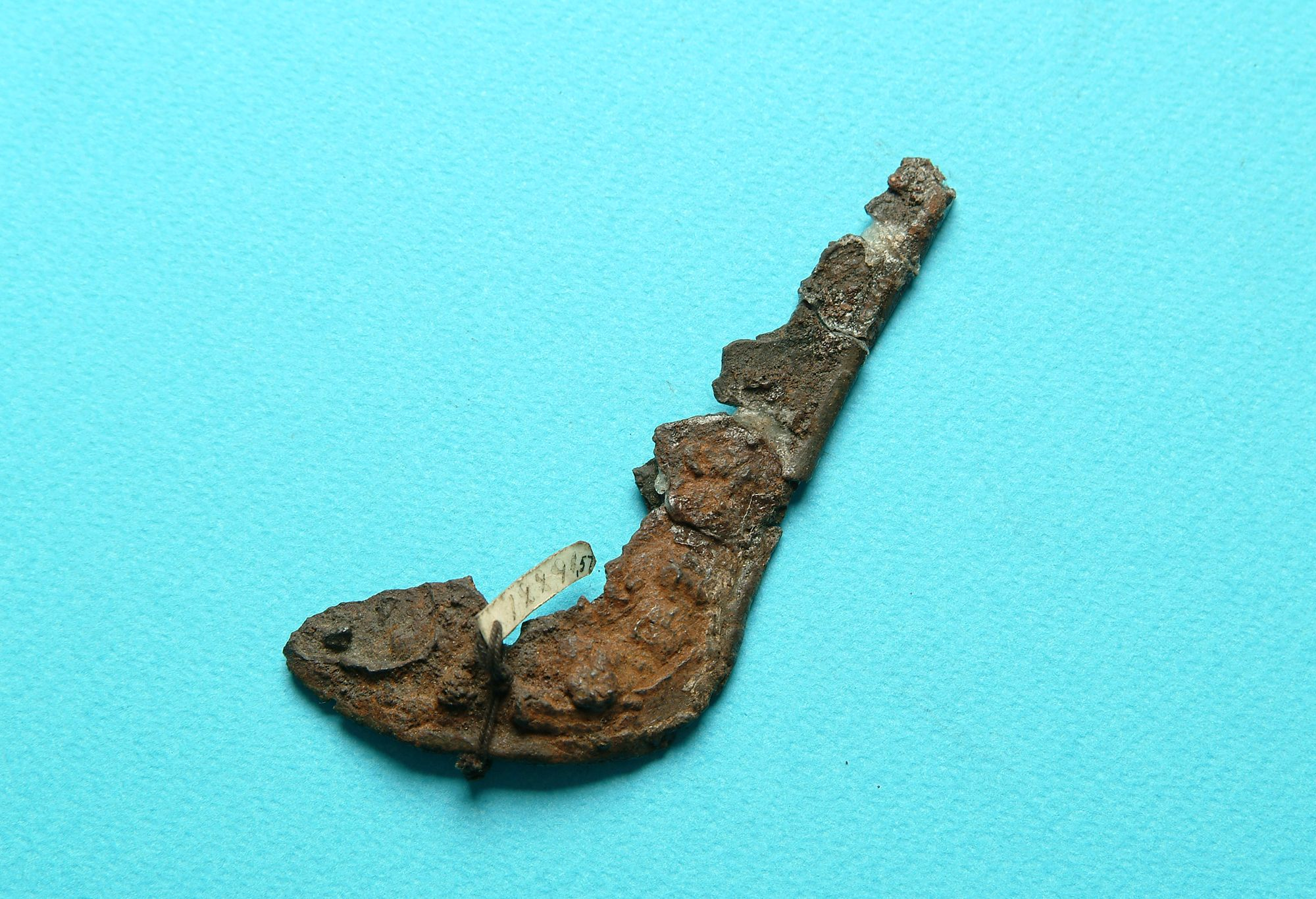
Cheek guard

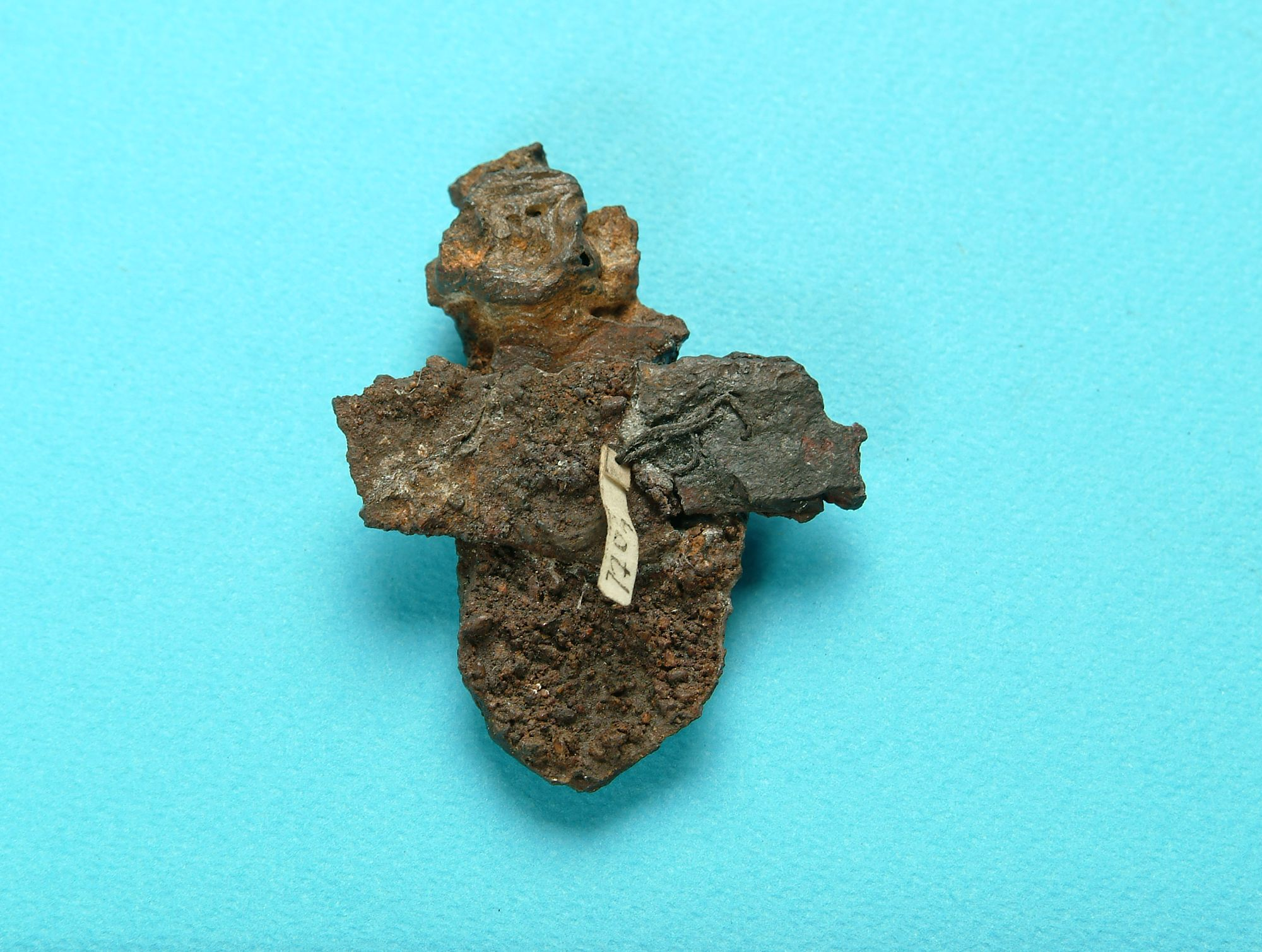
Nose guard

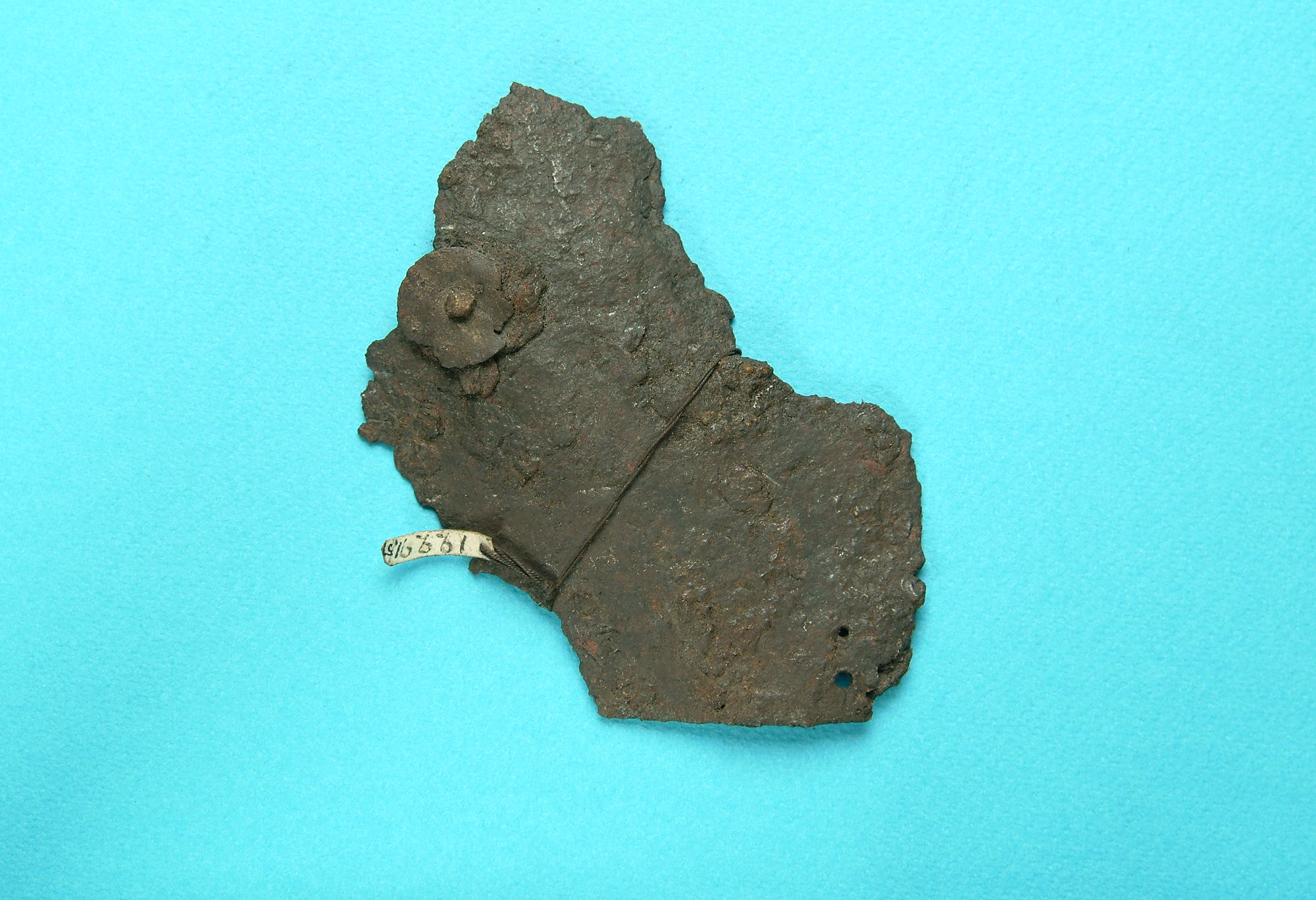
Cap

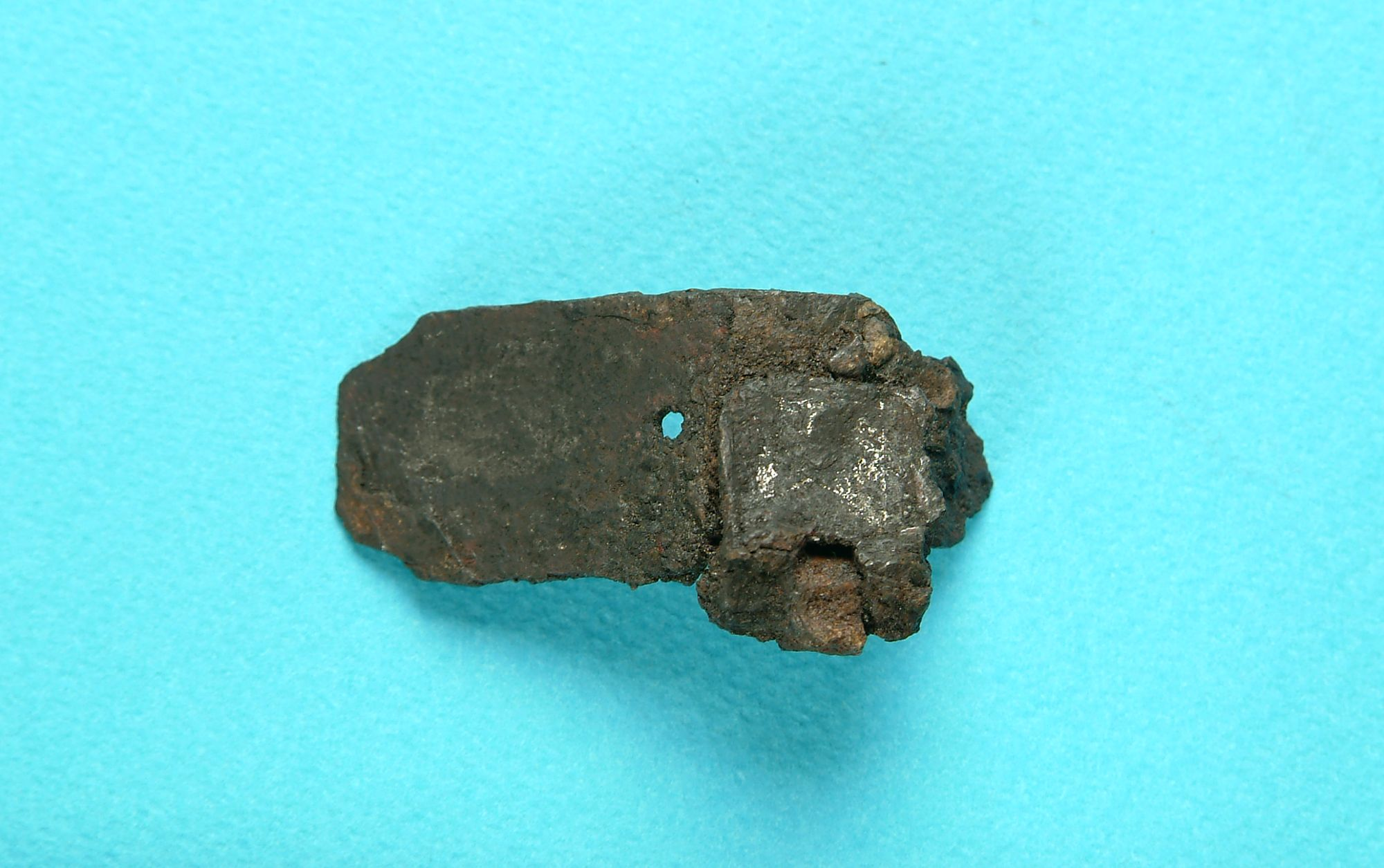
Brow band with hinge

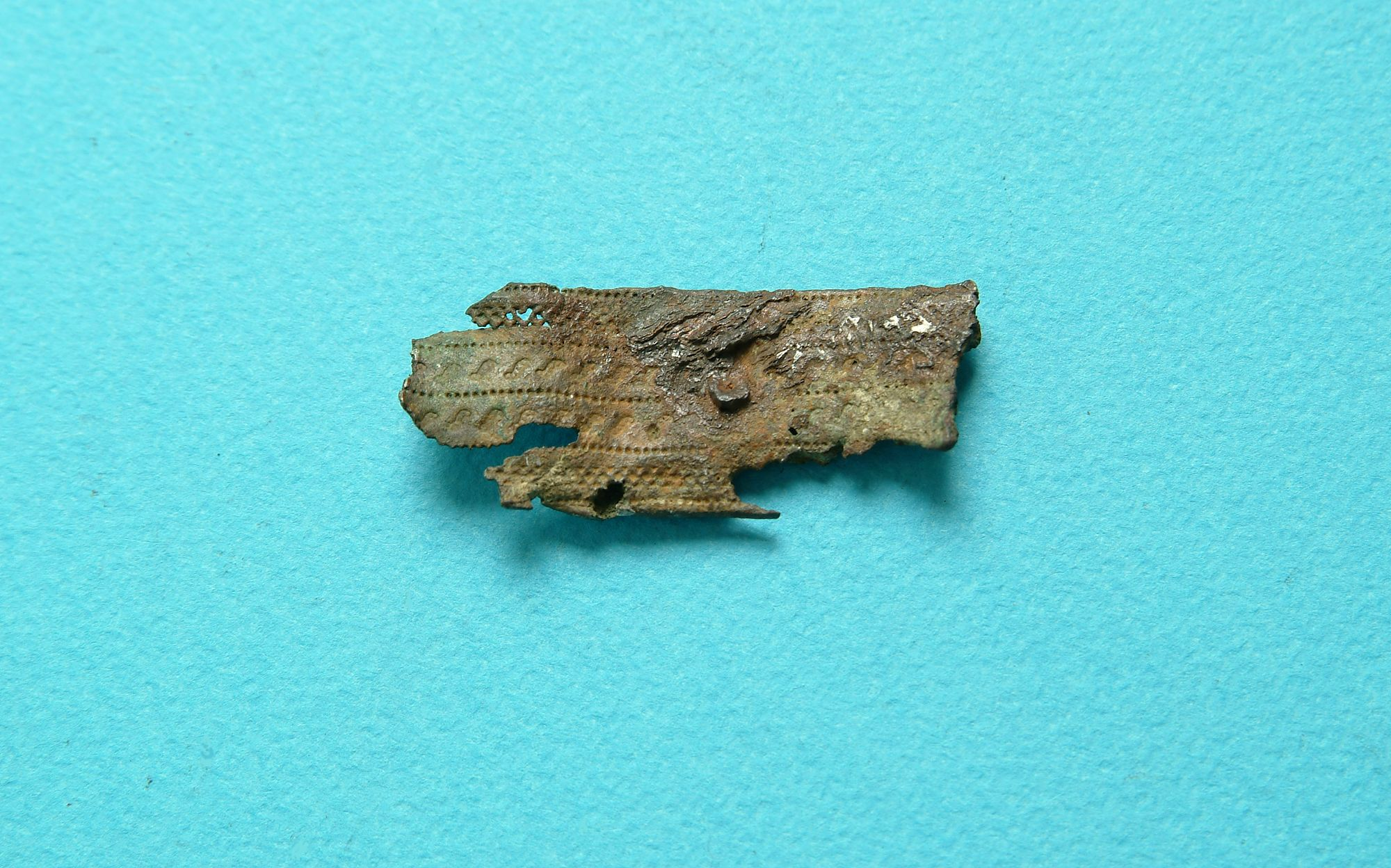
Nose-to-nape band (possible)

== Bibliography ==
- Arwidsson, Greta (1977). Valsgärde 7. Die Gräberfunde von Valsgärde (in German). Vol. III. Uppsala: Uppsala universitets museum för nordiska fornsaker. ISBN 91-506-0113-X.
- "Bild 224387". Sök i samlingarna. Statens historiska museum.
- "Bild 224398". Sök i samlingarna. Statens historiska museum.
- "Bild 224681". Sök i samlingarna. Statens historiska museum.
- "Bild 224761". Sök i samlingarna. Statens historiska museum.
- Bruce-Mitford, Rupert (1978). The Sutton Hoo Ship-Burial, Volume 2: Arms, Armour and Regalia. London: British Museum Publications. ISBN 978-0-7141-1331-9.
- Lindqvist, Sune (1925). "Vendelhjälmarnas ursprung" (PDF). Fornvännen (in Swedish). 20: 181–207. ISSN 0015-7813. Archived from the original (PDF) on 22 March 2017.
- Nerman, Birger (1969a). Die Vendelzeit Gotlands (II): Tafeln. Monographien Herausgegehen von der Kungliga Vitterhets Historie och Antikvitets Akademien (in German). Vol. 48. Stockholm: Almqvist & Wiksell.
- Nerman, Birger (1969b). Die Vendelzeit Gotlands: Provisorisches Verzeichnis der Tafelfiguren (in German). Stockholm: Almqvist & Wiksell.
- Nerman, Birger (1975). Die Vendelzeit Gotlands (I:1): Text. Monographien Herausgegehen von der Kungliga Vitterhets Historie och Antikvitets Akademien (in German). Vol. 55. Stockholm: Almqvist & Wiksell. ISBN 91-7402-016-1.
- "Statens Historiska Museum och k. Myntkabinettet: Tilväxten år 1904". Månadsblad: 1903–1905 (in Swedish). 31–34. Royal Swedish Academy of Letters, History and Antiquities: 126–189. 1907.
- Steuer, Heiko (1987). "Helm und Ringschwert: Prunkbewaffnung und Rangabzeichen germanischer Krieger" [Helmet and Ring-Sword: Ornamental Weapons and Insignia of Germanic Warriors]. In Häßler, Hans-Jürgen (ed.). Studien zur Sachsenforschung [Studies in Saxon Research] (in German). Vol. 6. Hildesheim: Lax. pp. 189–236. ISBN 3-7848-1617-7.
- Stolpe, Hjalmar & Arne, T. J. (1912). Graffältet vid Vendel (in Swedish). Stockholm: K. L. Beckmans Boktryckeri.
- Stolpe, Hjalmar & Arne, T. J. (1927). La Nécropole De Vendel (in French). Stockholm: Akademiens Förlag.
  - French edition of Stolpe & Arne 1912
- Tweddle, Dominic (1992). The Anglian Helmet from 16–22 Coppergate. The Archaeology of York. Vol. 17/8. London: Council for British Archaeology. ISBN 1-872414-19-2. Archived from the original on 21 March 2024.
