= Vänge, Gotland =

Vänge
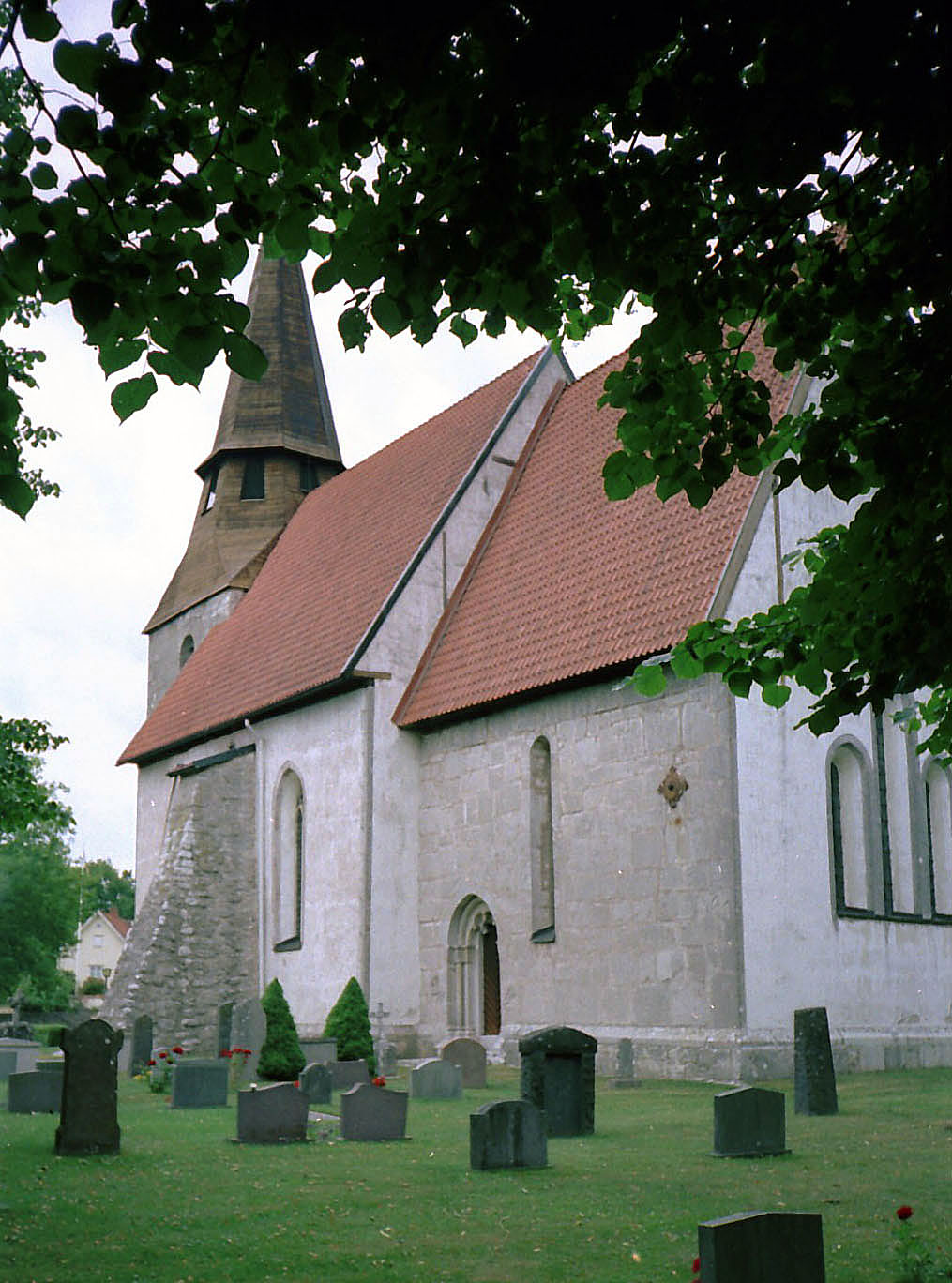
- Vänge Church

- Location within Gotland
- Coordinates: 57°27′7″N 18°30′41″E
- Country: Sweden
- Province: Gotland
- County: Gotland County
- Municipality: Gotland Municipality

Area
  - Total: 39.76 km^{2} (15.35 sq mi)

Population (2014)
  - Total: 390
- Time zone: UTC+1 (CET)
  - Summer (DST): UTC+2 (CEST)

Vänge is a populated area, a socken (not to be confused with parish), on the Swedish island of Gotland. It comprises the same area as the administrative Vänge District, established on 1 January 2016.

== Geography ==
Vänge is the name of the socken as well as the district. It is also the name of the small village surrounding the medieval Vänge Church, sometimes referred to as Vänge kyrkby. Vänge is situated in the central part of Gotland.

As of 2019, Vänge Church belongs to Vänge parish in Romaklosters pastorat, along with the churches in Buttle, Guldrupe, Sjonhem, Viklau and Halla.

One of the asteroids in the asteroid belt, 10794 Vänge, is named after this place.

== History ==
With the establishing of railways on Gotland in 1878, one of the stations resulted in the settlement Bjärges in Vänge. Other settlements are Bringes and Nickarve.

With several equestrian establishments, Vänge is horse country. The Western Riders Arena is used for western riding and rodeo events. A number of the members of the Gotland Western Riders also perform as jousting knights in the Tournamentum team at the annual Medieval Week on Gotland and national jousting tournaments.
