= Fardhem =

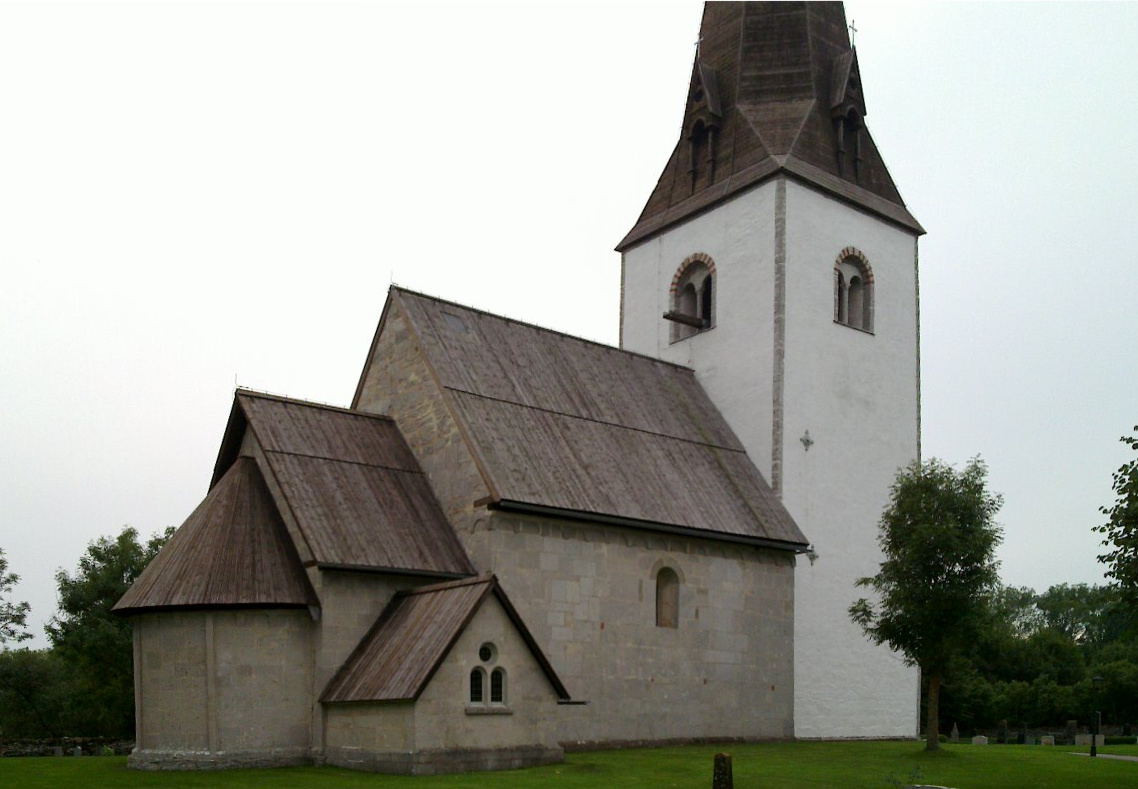
- Fardhem Church

- Location within Gotland
- Coordinates: 57°15′50″N 18°20′29″E
- Country: Sweden
- Province: Gotland
- County: Gotland County
- Municipality: Gotland Municipality

Area
  - Total: 20 km^{2} (7.7 sq mi)

Population (2014)
  - Total: 485
- Time zone: UTC+1 (CET)
  - Summer (DST): UTC+2 (CEST)

Fardhem (Swedish pronunciation: [ˈfɑ̂ːɖhɛm]) is a populated area, a socken (not to be confused with parish), on the Swedish island of Gotland. It comprises the same area as the administrative Fardhem District, established on 1 January 2016. The area is rural with farms, tourism and small companies as the main sources of income. It is home to football club Fardhem IF.

== Geography ==
Fardhem is the name of the socken as well as the district. It is also the name of the small village surrounding the medieval Fardhem Church, sometimes referred to as Fardhem kyrkby. It is situated on southern Gotland about 2 km (1.2 mi) northwest of Hemse. Most of the socken consists of farmed plains on land reclaimed from the drained Mästermyr to the south. Many of the farmed fields still have the same boundaries as in the 18th century.

In the middle of Fardhem is the Sandarve kulle nature reserve. Situated on a hill it covers 15 ha (37 acres) at an elevation of about 60 m (200 ft). It was established in 1984.

As of 2019, Fardhem Church belongs to Fardhem parish in Fardhems pastorat.

== History ==
The locality is mentioned as Farþhaim in the 14th century Gutasaga. The last part of the name hem means "dwelling" or "farm" and the first part fardh means "trail" or "a place where you can travel", it may refer to the Ancylus wall, a remaining bank of the Ancylus Lake that made a good "road" to travel on.

The area has been populated since the Bronze Age. There are grave fields, house foundations, groove stones and two hillforts from the Iron Age. One runestone and a silver treasure from the Viking Age have also been found in Fardhem.

The locality has a wool mill and weapons repair shop.
