= Halla, Gotland =

Halla
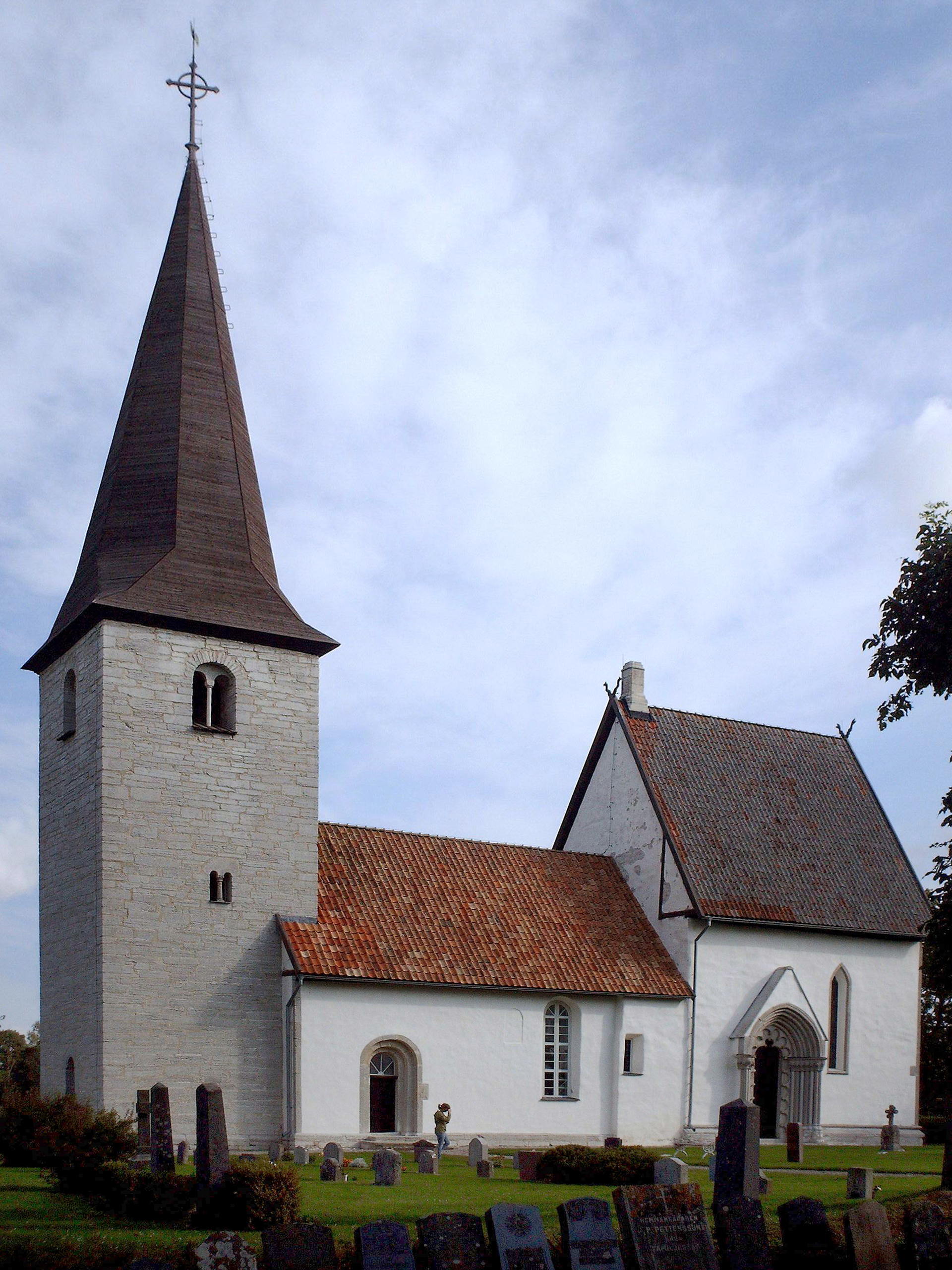
- Halla Church

- Location within Gotland
- Coordinates: 57°30′39″N 18°29′50″E
- Country: Sweden
- Province: Gotland
- County: Gotland County
- Municipality: Gotland Municipality

Area
  - Total: 14.87 km^{2} (5.74 sq mi)

Population (2014)
  - Total: 231
- Time zone: UTC+1 (CET)
  - Summer (DST): UTC+2 (CEST)

Halla is a populated area, a socken (not to be confused with parish), on the Swedish island of Gotland. It comprises the same area as the administrative Halla District, established on 1 January 2016.

== Geography ==
Halla is situated in central Gotland. The medieval Halla Church is located in the socken. As of 2019, Halla Church belongs to Vänge parish in Romaklosters pastorat, along with the churches in Vänge, Buttle, Guldrupe, Sjonhem and Viklau.

== History ==
In 1904, the Broe helmet (RAÄ number Halla 48:1) was found in a cremation grave at Broe farm, Högbro in Halla. It is a decorated Vendel iron helmet, of which only fragments remain.

== Heritage railway ==
Running through Halla is the 6.5 km-long Gotland Hesselby Railway (Gotlands Hesselby Jernväg), a narrow-gauge line run by the Gotland Train Association (Föreningen Gotlandståget).
