= Fardhem Church =

- Fardhem kyrka
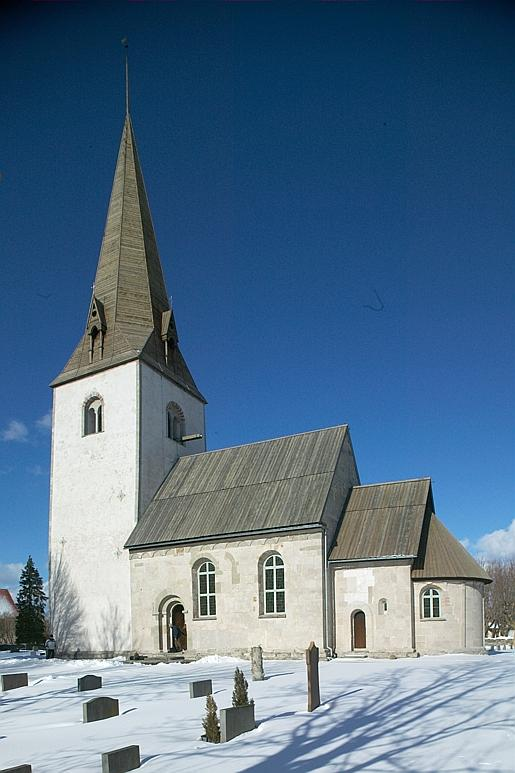
- Fardhem Church, view of the exterior

- Location on Gotland
- 57°15′50″N 18°20′29″E
- Country: Sweden
- Denomination: Church of Sweden

Administration
- Diocese: Visby

Fardhem Church (Swedish: Fardhems kyrka) is a medieval church in Fardhem on the Swedish island of Gotland. The present-day church may have been preceded by a stave church; the current church is one of the most well-preserved Romanesque churches on Gotland, built in stages from the 12th to 13th century. It belongs to the Church of Sweden and lies in the Diocese of Visby.

== History ==
According to the Gutasaga, one of the earliest churches on Gotland was built in Fardhem. If so, this was a stave church of which nothing remains today; However, early graves discovered in the area suggest that a wooden church stood on the site of the present stone structure early on.

The church seen today is also of considerable age. It is a Romanesque building, erected in stages from the end of the 12th century to the second quarter of the 13th century. Only the vestry is later, added in 1871-72 and designed by Axel Haig (known in Sweden by his original name Axel Herman Hägg.

== Architecture ==
The exterior of the church has a uniform, Romanesque appearance. It is considered to be one of the best-preserved Romanesque churches on Gotland (at least externally). Especially noteworthy is the choir portal. It is decorated with a few rather primitive sculpted elements, difficult to interpret. The work has been attributed to the locally active stone sculptor Hegvald but may also be the work of some unknown master from Jutland. There are no comparable works on Gotland.

The interior of the church is less well-preserved. Fragments of murals from the 14th century were discovered during a restoration in 1951–52, and are now again visible. The baptismal font is Romanesque, probably a work by the sculptor known by the notname Semi-Byzantios, but only the foot remains. Most other furnishings are from the 17th and 18th centuries.
