= Halla Church =

- Halla kyrka
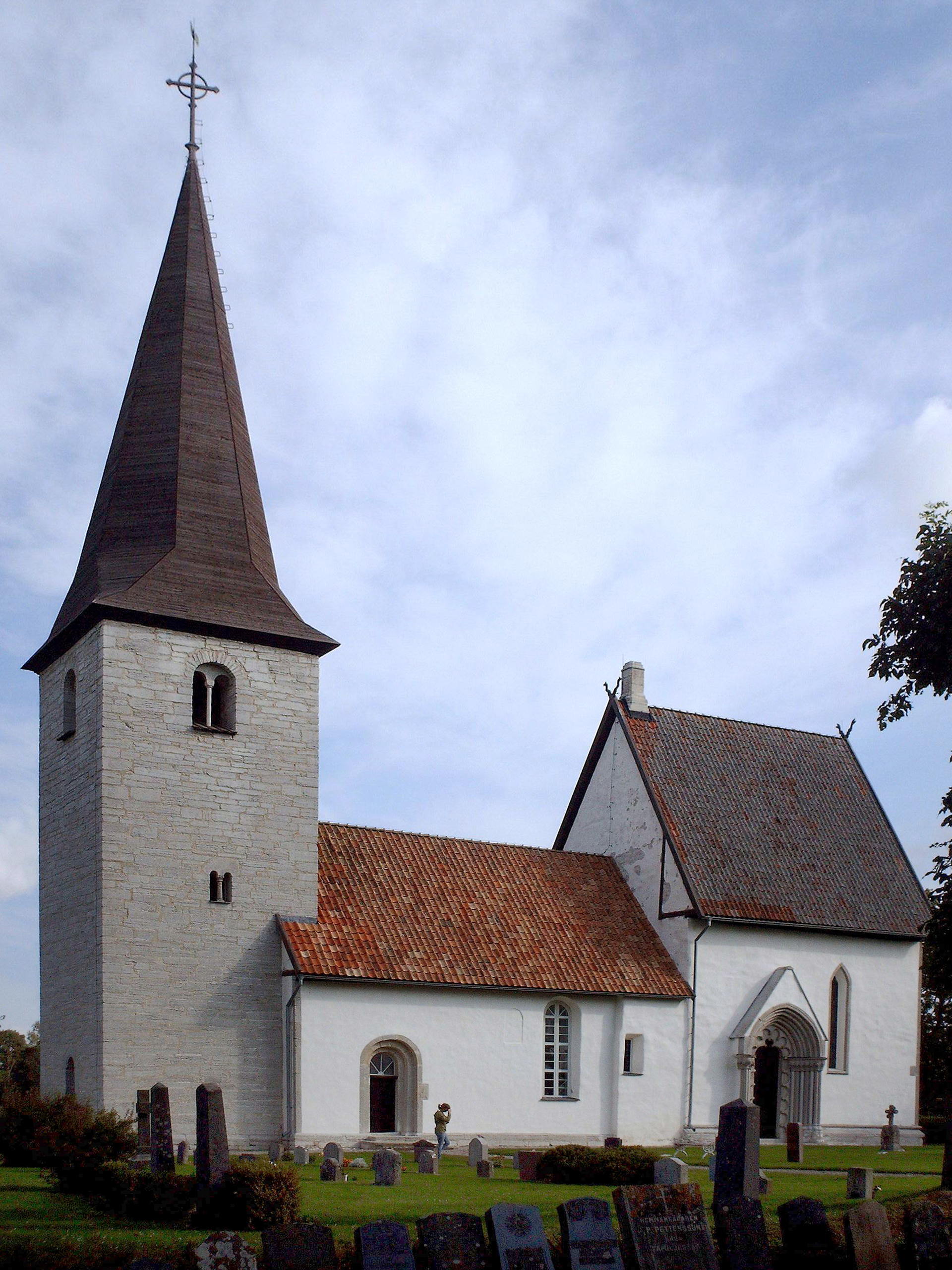
- Halla Church, view of the exterior

- Location on Gotland
- 57°30′39″N 18°29′50″E
- Country: Sweden
- Denomination: Church of Sweden

Administration
- Diocese: Visby

Halla Church (Swedish: Halla kyrka) is a medieval church in Halla on the Swedish island Gotland. It is part of the Diocese of Visby.

== History and architecture ==
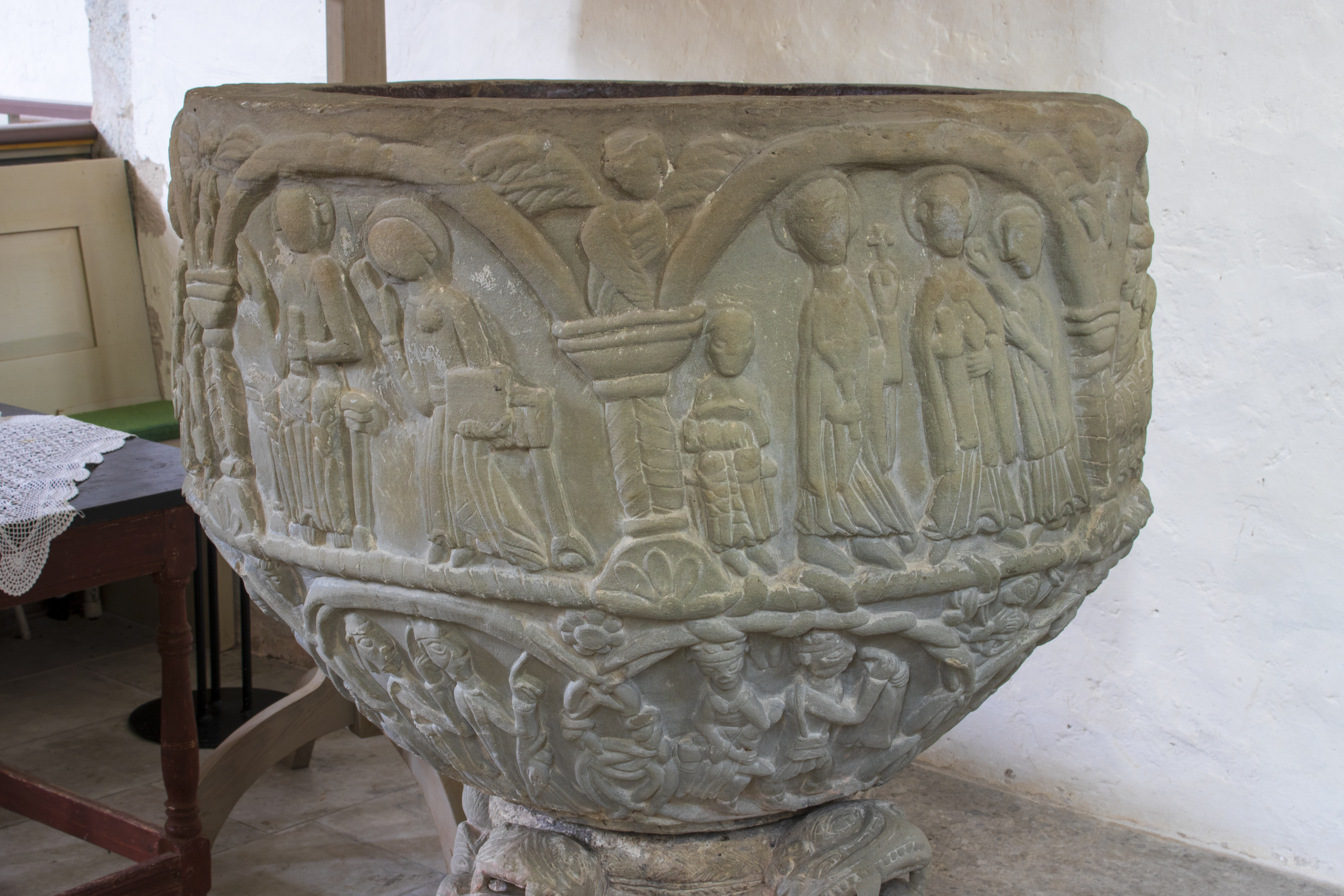
The baptismal font by Hegvald

The oldest part of Halla Church is the Romanesque nave, dating from circa 1200. The tower is slightly later, while the disproportionately large choir is from the middle of the 14th century, in Gothic style and replacing an older on the same spot. Scholars have concluded that there were plans to replace the whole church with a Gothic edifice, but the builders probably ran out of funds after constructing the choir.

The exterior of the church is thus a mix of Romanesque and Gothic. A few sculpted stones decorate the Romanesque nave. They were possibly made by the sculptor known as Sigraf. Two fragmentary runestones are immured in the choir, one containing the phrase "...men from Lübeck killed...". The choir portal is decorated with sculptured capitals.

Inside, the nave is dominated by a large painted ceiling, dating from 1697. In the middle of the painting is a depiction of the Final Judgement, and in circles in the corners Saint Peter and Saint Paul. The choir walls are furthermore decorated with murals, quite worn. They depict apostles and a number of saints, including Saint Martin and Saint George and the Dragon. The murals date from the 15th and 16th centuries, and some of them have been attributed to the Master of the Passion of Christ.

The church contains two medieval items of interest. It has a triumphal cross from the middle of the 15th century, probably made outside Gotland. The church also has a baptismal font made by the sculptor Hegvald. It has been described as one of the most interesting baptismal fonts on Gotland. Its reliefs depict the childhood of Christ but also other subjects.

Halla Church was renovated in 1965.
