= Guldrupe Church =

- Guldrupe kyrka
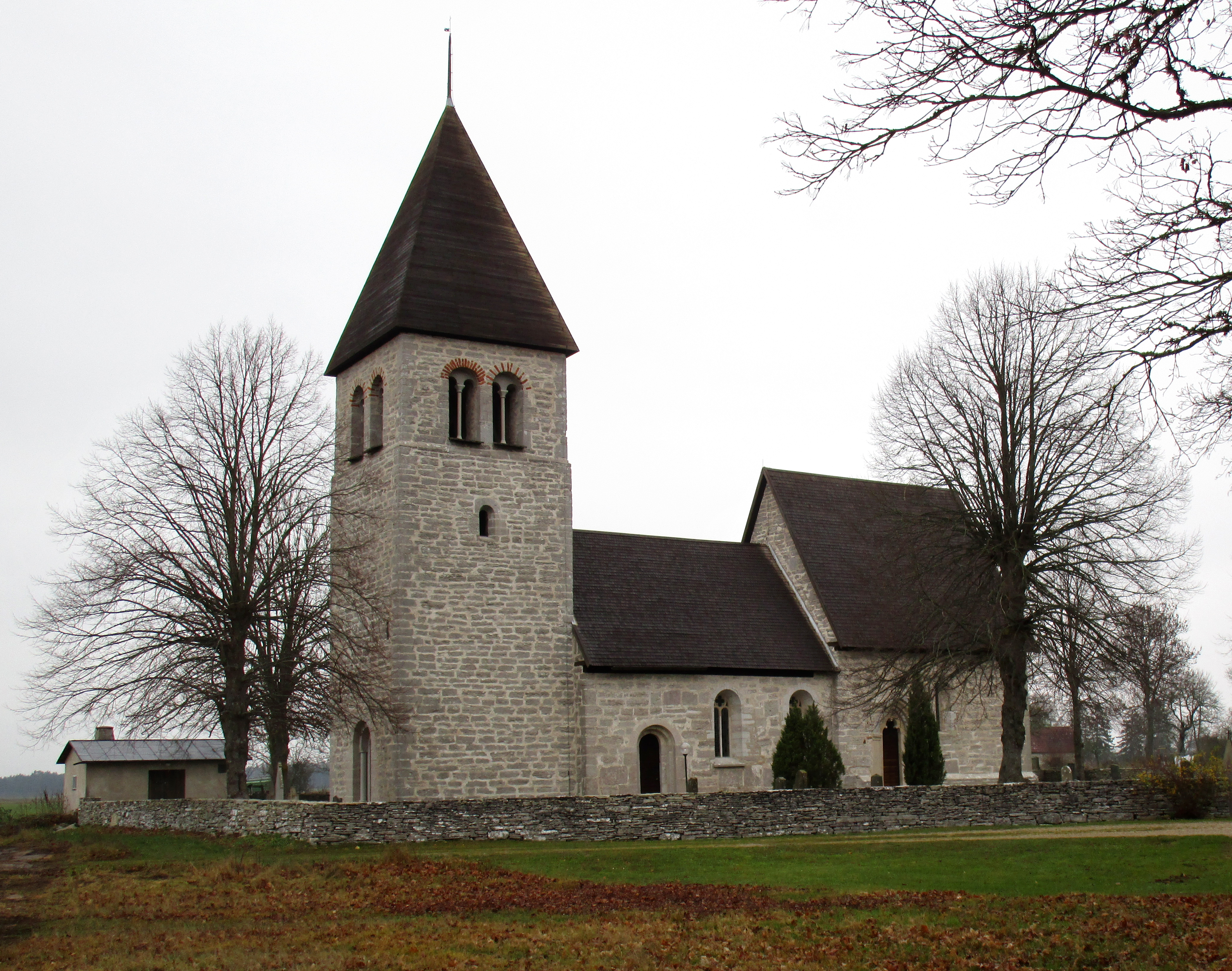
- Guldrupe Church, view of the exterior

- Location on Gotland
- 57°25′49″N 18°25′36″E
- Country: Sweden
- Denomination: Church of Sweden

Administration
- Diocese: Visby

Guldrupe Church (Swedish: Guldrupe kyrka) is a medieval church in Guldrupe on the island of Gotland. Its peculiar shape is due to the nave being older than the choir. It belongs to the Church of Sweden and lies in the Diocese of Visby (Sweden).

== History ==
The oldest parts of the presently visible church is the nave, dating from the late 12th century. Oak planks decorated with dragons have however been found on the site, and indicate that there may have existed an earlier, wooden church on the spot. The tower dates from the early 13th century, and from the end of the same century dates the dis-proportionally large choir and sacristy. The choir replaced an earlier, smaller choir, but plans to replace also the nave were never carried out. The church has not been substantially altered since the Middle Ages. The windows date from 1865 and the church was renovated in 1964–65.

== Architecture ==
The church is built of limestone. The nave and tower are Romanesque in style, while the somewhat later and larger choir is Gothic. The pyramidal tower spire is unusual in that its construction is largely original.
