= Etelhem Church =

- Etelhem kyrka
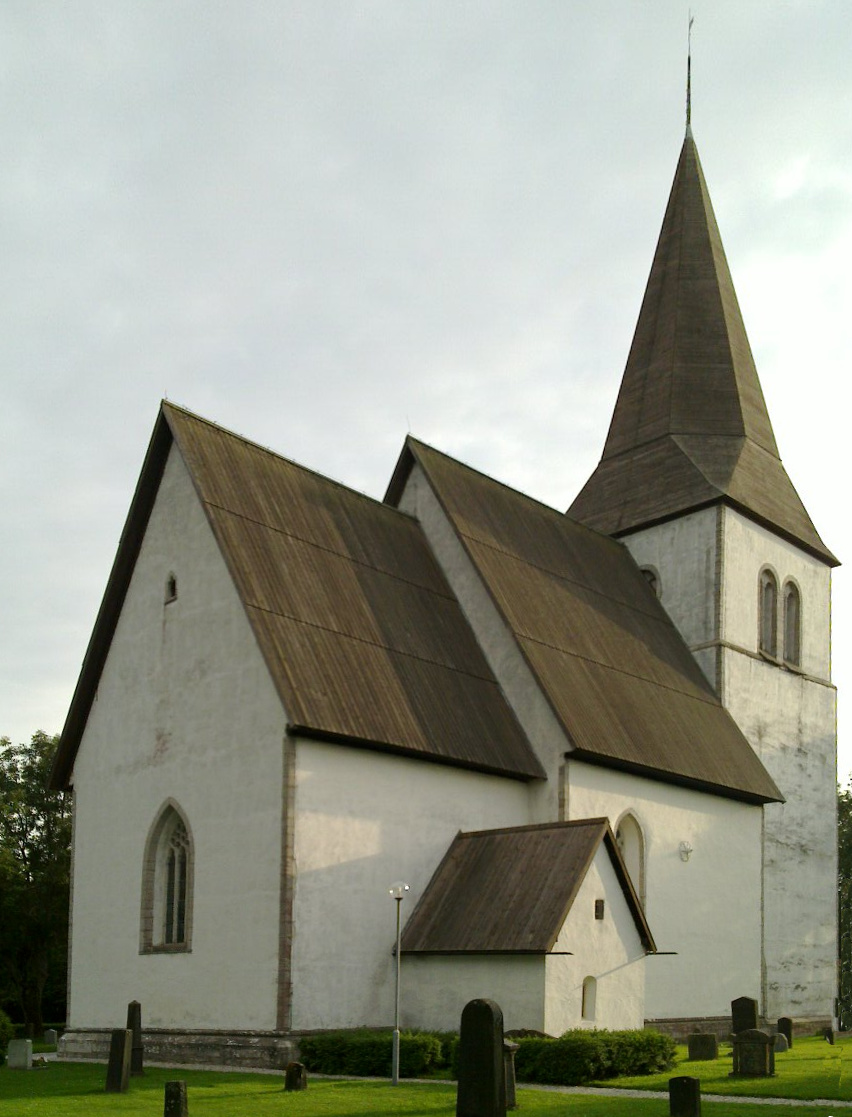
- Etelhem Church, view of the exterior

- Location on Gotland
- 57°20′14″N 18°29′45″E
- Country: Sweden
- Denomination: Church of Sweden

Administration
- Diocese: Visby

Etelmhem Church (Swedish: Etelhems kyrka) is a medieval church on the Swedish island of Gotland. The largely Gothic church contains medieval murals and a 12th-century baptismal font by the sculptor Hegvald. The church is used by the Church of Sweden and part of Diocese of Visby.

== History and architecture ==
The first church erected on the site was probably a small Romanesque stone church, of which only fragments remain. The oldest part of the presently visible, mainly Gothic church is the tower, erected in the early 13th century and still in Romanesque style. The choir and nave seem to have been built circa 1300. The vestry is the latest addition to the church, stemming from the 17th century.

The exterior of the church displays a few sculpted elements of Romanesque origins, and a likewise Romanesque northern portal. Inside, the church is decorated with murals from two different periods. The oldest ones, dating from the 14th century, are fragmentary, while the somewhat later (15th century) depict apostles and the Passion of Christ. These later paintings were made by the artist known as the Master of the Passion of Christ (Passionsmästaren). A few original stained glass windows also remain.

The most noteworthy item among the furnishings is the 12th century baptismal font by the sculptor, or possibly workshop, named Hegvald. It is signed in runes. The triumphal cross is from the 14th century and still in its original place. Most later furnishings are from the 17th century.

The church was renovated in 1957-58.

It belongs to the Diocese of Visby of the Church of Sweden.
