= Buttle, Gotland =

Buttle
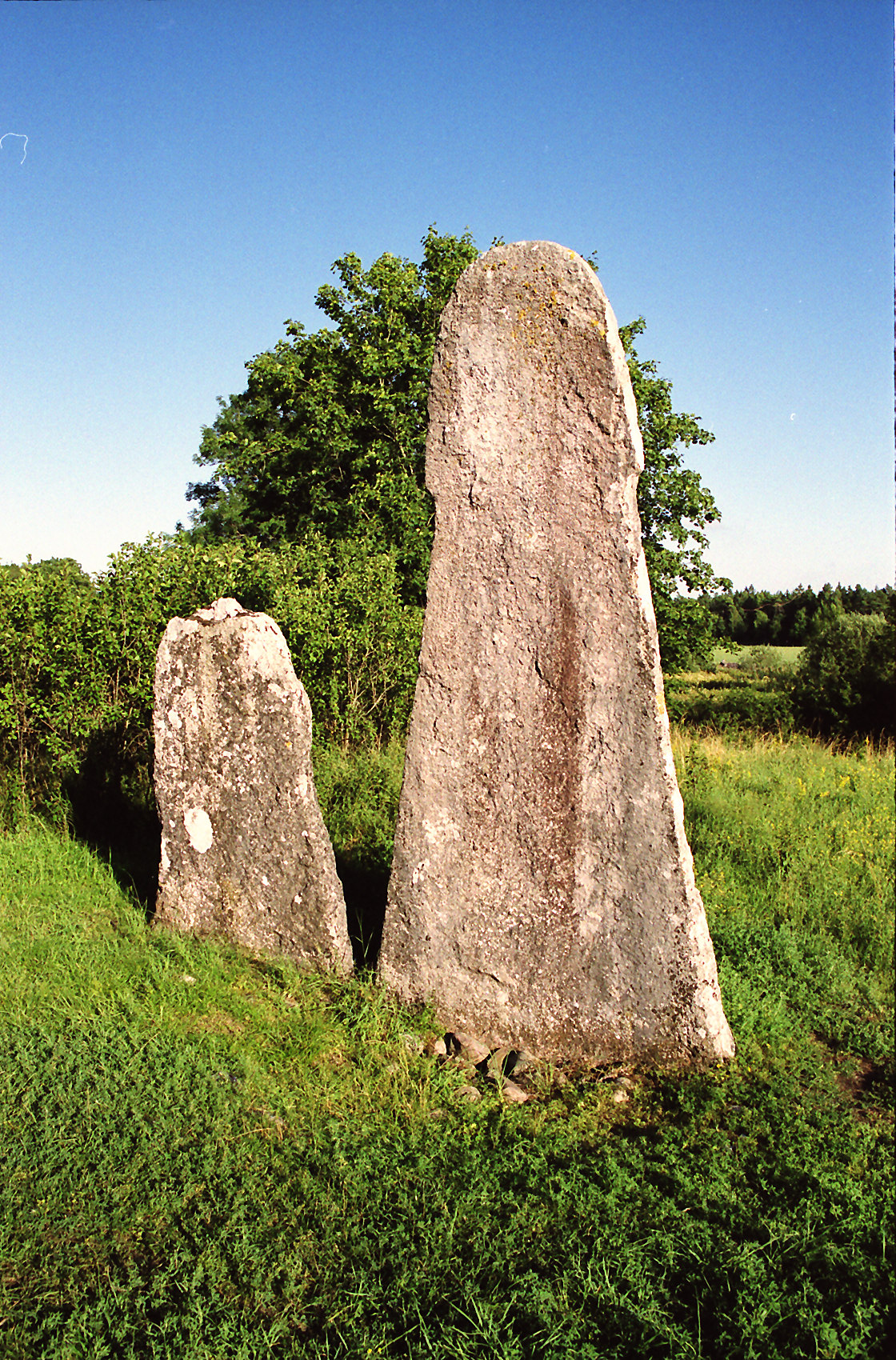
- Änge picture stones in Buttle

- Location within Gotland
- Coordinates: 57°24′9″N 18°31′47″E
- Country: Sweden
- Province: Gotland
- County: Gotland County
- Municipality: Gotland Municipality

Area
  - Total: 31.07 km^{2} (12.00 sq mi)

Population (2014)
  - Total: 90
- Time zone: UTC+1 (CET)
  - Summer (DST): UTC+2 (CEST)

Buttle is a populated area, a socken (not to be confused with parish), on the Swedish island of Gotland. It comprises the same area as the administrative Buttle District, established on 1 January 2016.

== Geography ==
Buttle is situated in the central part of Gotland. The medieval Buttle Church is located in the socken. As of 2019, Buttle Church belongs to Vänge parish in Romaklosters pastorat, along with the churches in Vänge, Guldrupe, Sjonhem, Viklau and Halla.

As of 2016, Buttle is best known for holding the record for both the lowest and highest temperature on Gotland. The highest temperature, 35.2 °C (95.4 °F), was recorded on 8 August 1975 and the lowest, −32.8 °C (−27.0 °F), on 9 February 1966.

== History ==
Two of the few picture stones left in their original places on Gotland, are located at Änge in Buttle. Most other stones have been used as building material in local churches or moved to various museums. At 3.85 m (12.6 ft), the larger of the two is also the tallest known picture stone on the island.
