= Hegvald =

Hegvald (also Hegwald, Hegwaldr, fl. c. 1175-1200) was a Romanesque stone sculptor of baptismal fonts, working on Gotland.

== Works ==
The name of Hegvald is derived from a rune inscription on one of the baptismal fonts attributed to the sculptor, but the name may also be that of a patron. On stylistic grounds, 11 baptismal fonts on Gotland have been attributed to the, in effect, anonymous master sculptor. He seems to have started as an apprentice in the workshop of the somewhat earlier Majestatis. His style is characterised by its mix between classic Romanesque and lingering Norse influences. The works attributed to Hegvald are expressive on the verge of grotesque, somewhat vernacular and typically sculpting covers the whole of the font, including the base and foot.

Baptismal fonts from his atelier can be found in När, Sjonhem, Stånga, Halla and Etelhem churches, all on Gotland, as well as in the Swedish Museum of National Antiquities in Stockholm. He is also attributed as the artist of a triumphal cross in Vänge Church, also on Gotland. The choir portal of Fardhem Church is also attributed to Hegvald.

== Gallery ==
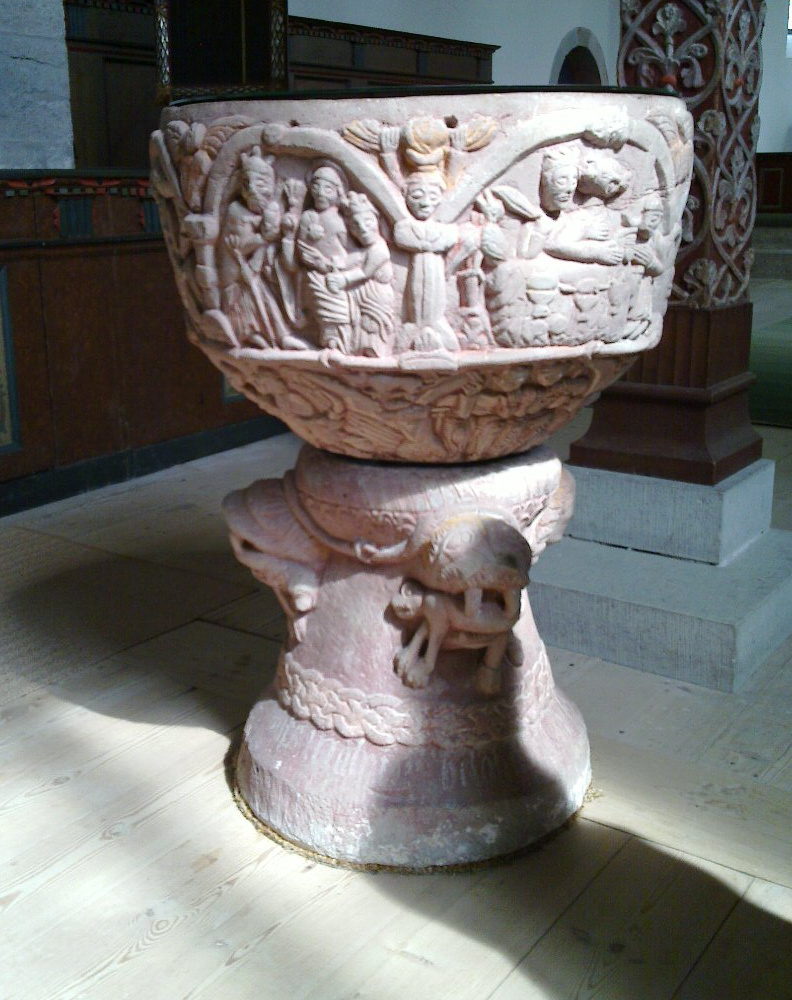
Font in Stånga church, Gotland

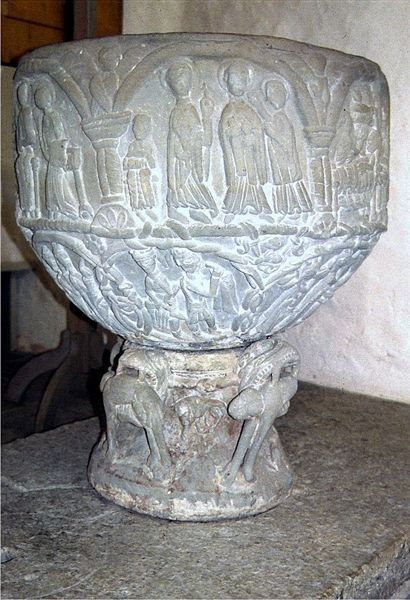
Font in Halla church, Gotland

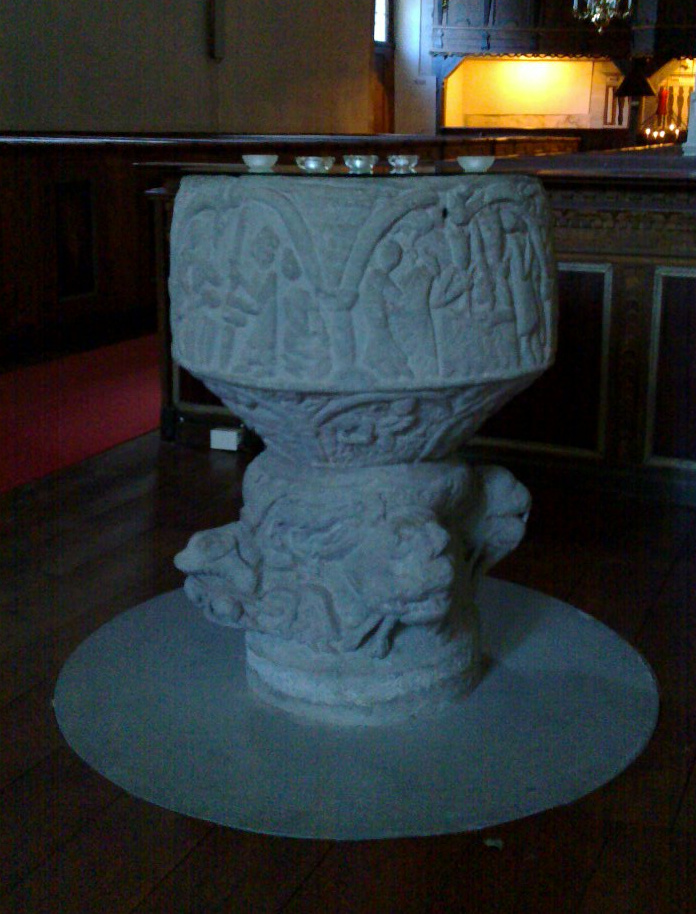
Font in När church, Gotland

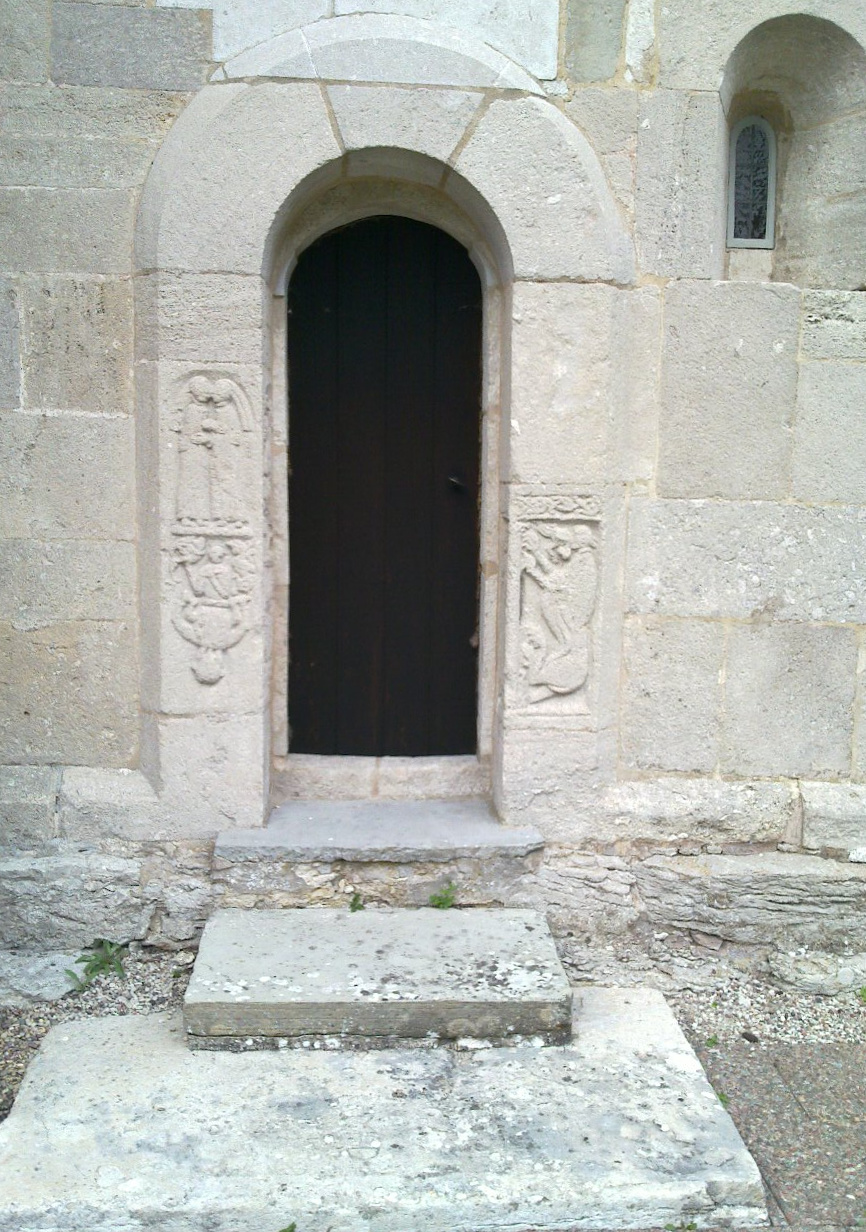
Choir portal of Fardhem church, Gotland

== See also ==
- Byzantios
- Calcarius
- Majestatis
- Sigraf
