= När Church =

- Närs kyrka
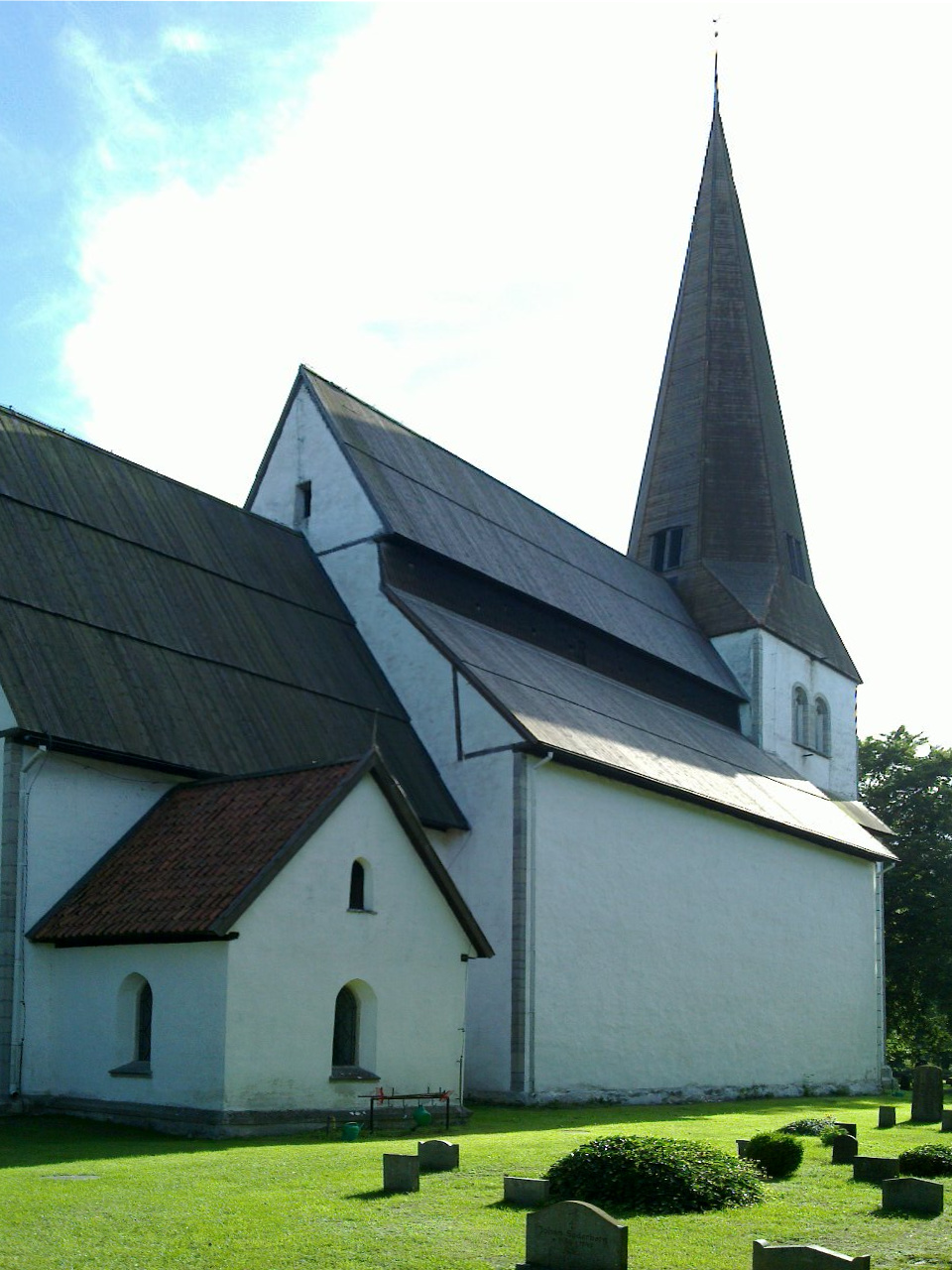
- När Church, view of the exterior

- Location on Gotland
- 57°15′26″N 18°37′31″E
- Country: Sweden
- Denomination: Church of Sweden

Administration
- Diocese: Visby

När Church (Swedish: Närs kyrka) is a medieval church on the Swedish island of Gotland. It belongs to the Church of Sweden and lies in the Diocese of Visby.

== History and architecture ==
The oldest part of the presently visible church at När is the tower, erected in the middle of the 13th century. Originally, it was designed to be able to function as a defensive tower, with arrowslits still visible on the first floor. The present nave and choir of the church were added to the tower around the year 1300. Of an earlier, Romanesque church on the same site no traces remain today.

Externally, the church has two portals decorated with stone sculptures on the southern façade. Internally, the nave is divided into two by two central columns. Among the furnishings, the Romanesque baptismal font is the oldest. It was made by the sculptor known as Hegvald and its sculptured reliefs display religious motifs. The church also has a late medieval triumphal cross. Other furnishings are mostly from the 17th and early 18th centuries. In one of the lychgates leading to the church, a decorated tombstone from 1322 is displayed.
