= Vänge Church, Gotland =

Vänge Church
- Vänge kyrka
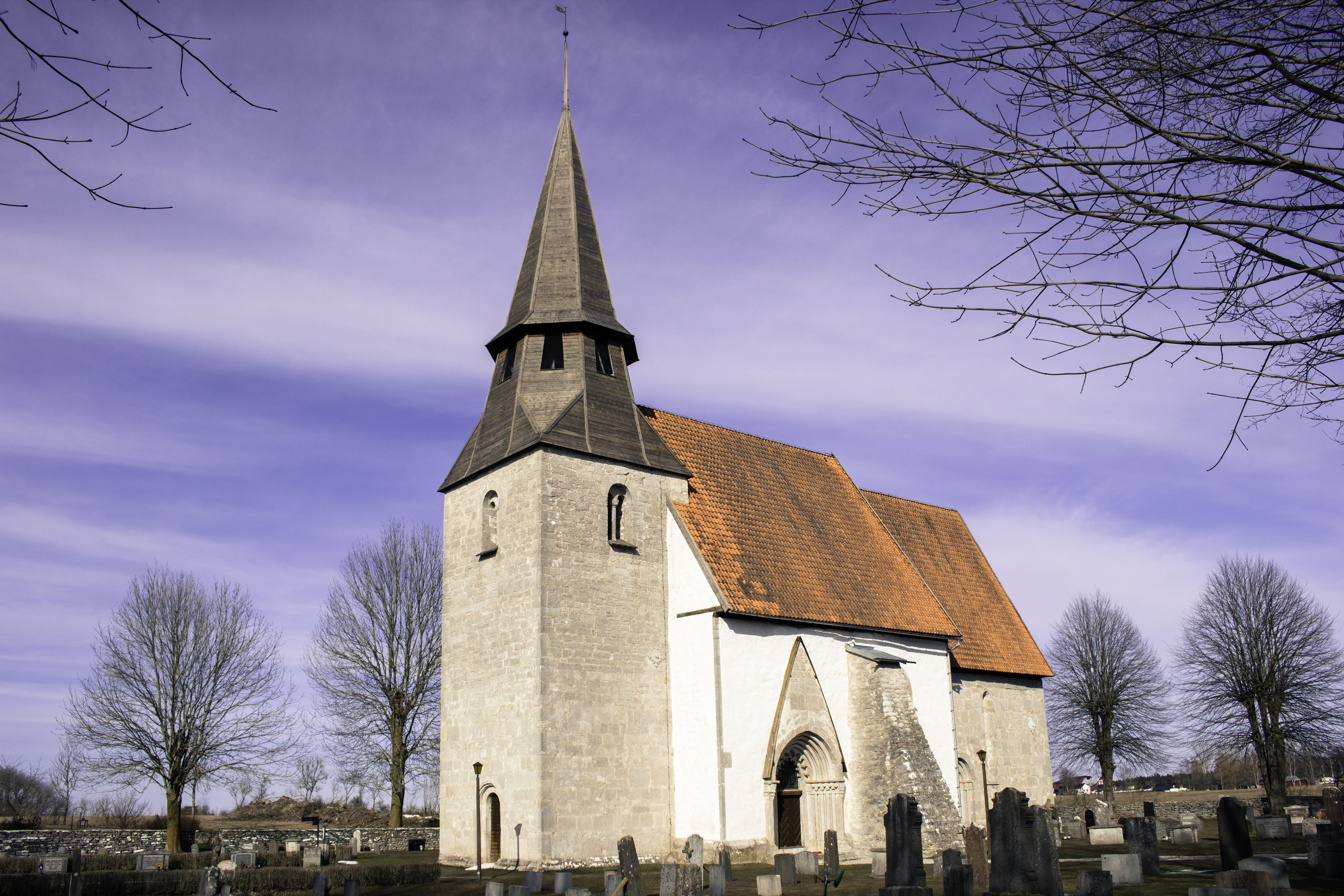
- Vänge Church

- Location within Gotland
- 57°27′07″N 18°30′41″E
- Country: Sweden
- Denomination: Church of Sweden

Administration
- Diocese: Visby

Vänge Church (Swedish: Vänge kyrka) is a medieval church in Vänge on the island of Gotland, Sweden. Its oldest parts date to circa 1200. It belongs to the Diocese of Visby.

== History and architecture ==
The Romanesque church tower is the oldest part of the church. It was built circa 1200. Originally it was attached to a Romanesque church, the nave and choir of which however was replaced with the presently visible Gothic parts at the end of the 13th century. The sacristy is the only non-medieval part of the church; it was built in 1866. The exterior of the church is decorated with Romanesque reliefs, re-used from the earlier church and incorporated into the Gothic structure. Inside, the choir retains traces of original medieval murals.

Several of the church fittings are medieval. The baptismal font dates from the 12th century and was made by the sculptor Hegvald; it is considered one of the artist's finest pieces. The church also houses a triumphal cross from the same century. The altarpiece is also medieval but was altered in the 17th century. Most of the other fittings, such as the pews and the pulpit, date from later centuries.
