= List of medieval churches on Gotland =

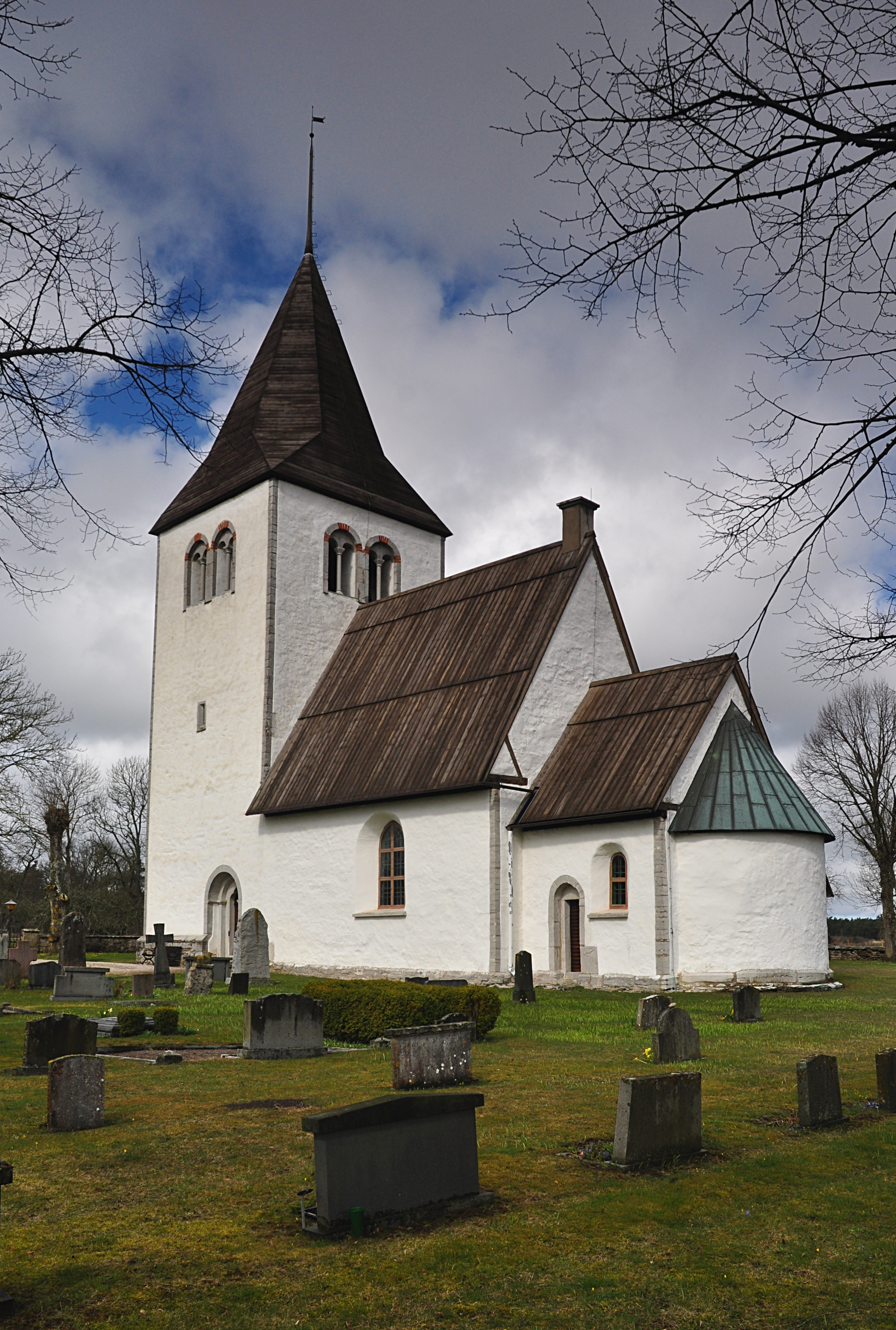
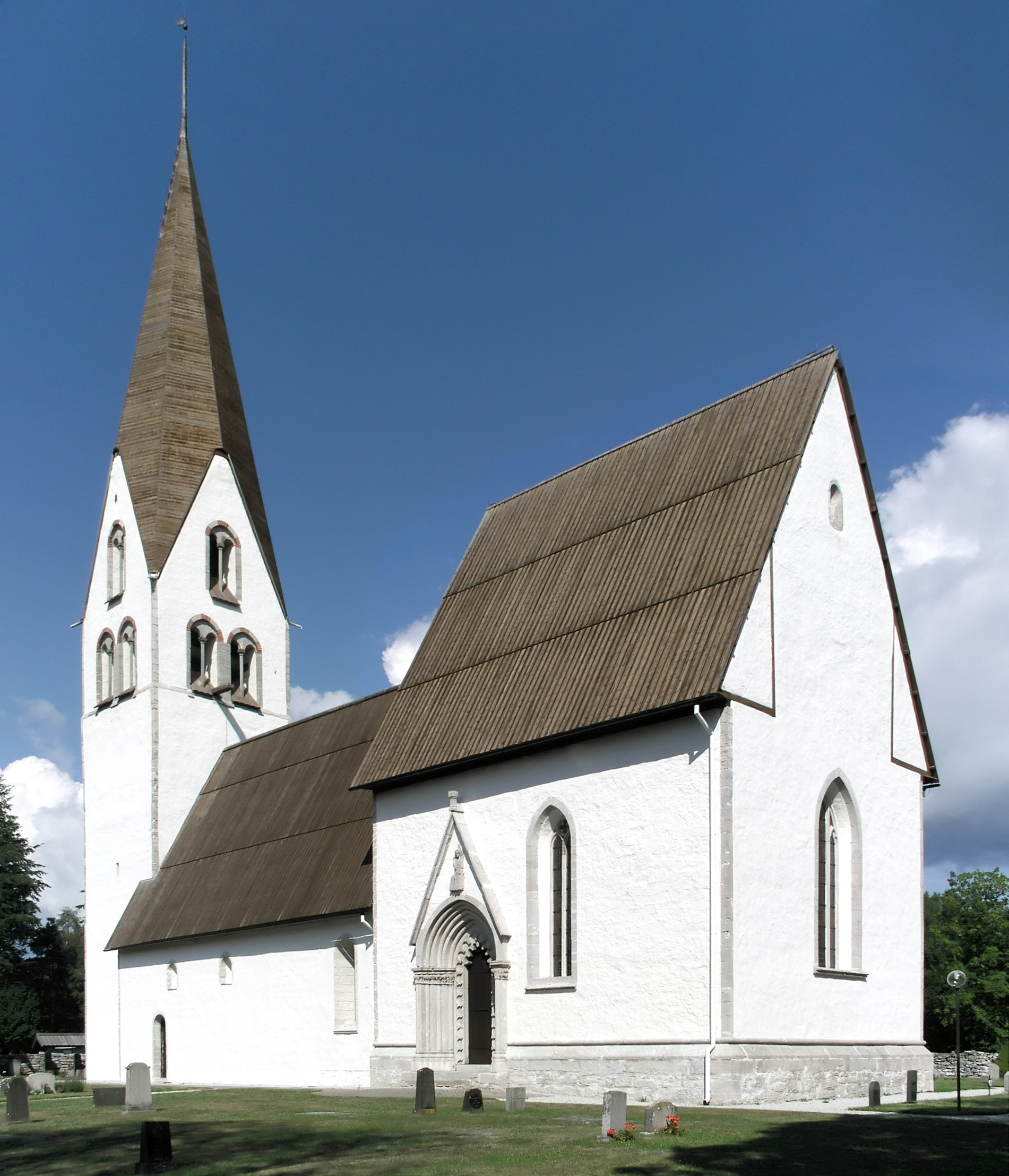
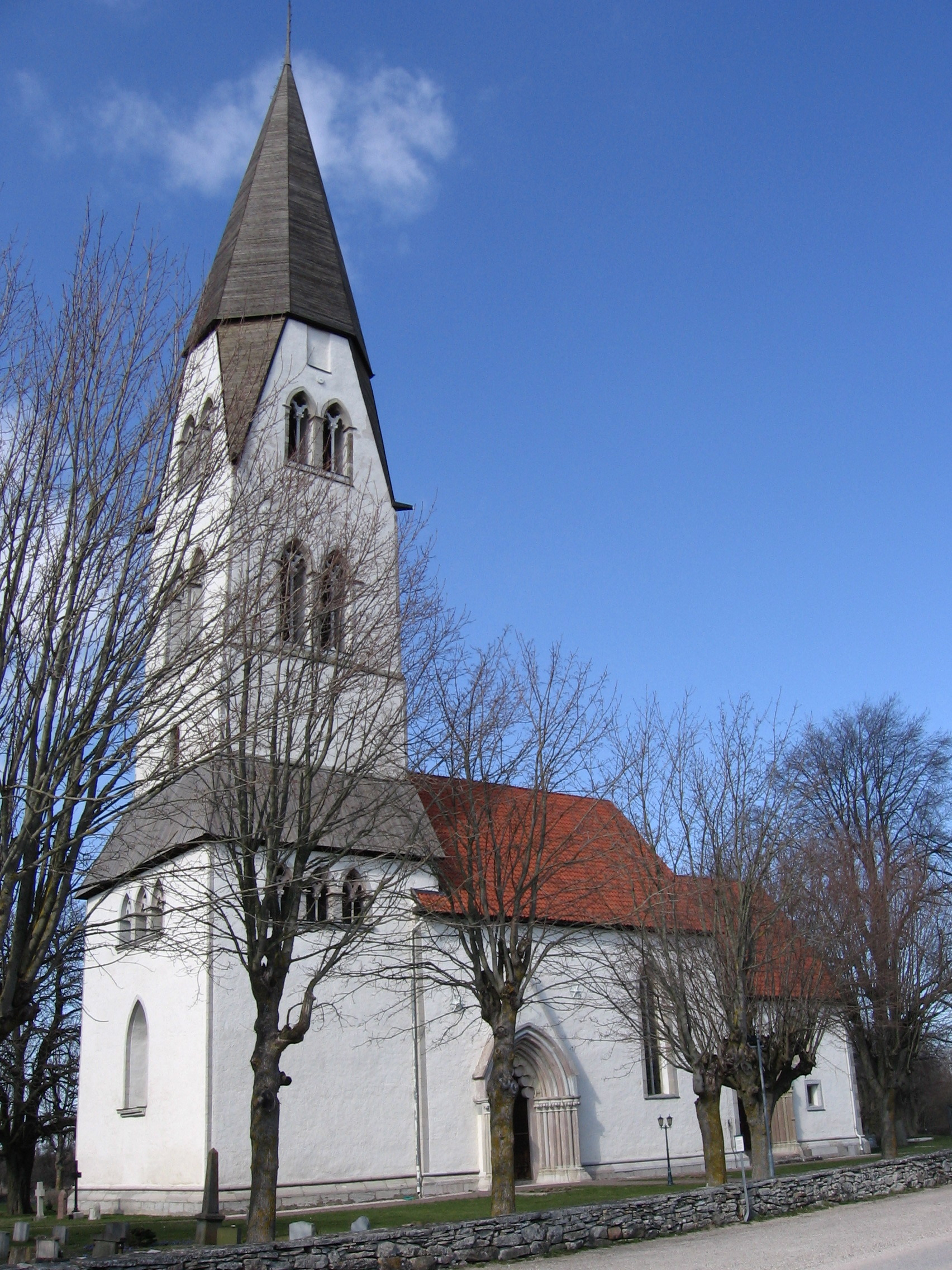
The development of church architecture on Gotland. Top: Akebäck, an unaltered Romanesque church. Middle: Garde; rebuilding started but not finished. Bottom: rebuilding complete at Rone, finished in the middle of the 14th century.

There are 92 well-preserved churches from the Middle Ages on the Swedish island of Gotland, more than in any other part of Sweden and unusually many compared with other parts of Europe. Benefiting from its location in the middle of the Baltic Sea, the island enjoyed an increase in wealth thanks to expanding trade between Western and Eastern Europe, giving the inhabitants the means to build large and prestigious churches. The preserved churches date from between the early 12th century and the middle of the 14th century. The first churches were stave churches, but of these only fragments remain. The oldest substantially preserved churches on Gotland are simple Romanesque churches. Church architecture remained conservative on Gotland, and, while Gothic forms eventually replaced Romanesque, it never acquired the structurally light character it did elsewhere in Europe. The churches built during the first half of the 14th century on Gotland are sometimes referred to as "counter-Gothic" (kontragotik) in Swedish literature.

The churches were often decorated inside with paintings on walls and vaults and stained-glass windows, as well as decorative sculptures both inside and outside. In the Gothic period particularly, the portals of the churches were adorned with stone sculptures. Workshops specialising in the production of decorated baptismal fonts established themselves on Gotland during the 12th century and supplied the churches with fonts, which in many cases still exist in the churches. Wooden sculptures were also produced from an early time, including rood crosses and sculptures of saints like the Viklau Madonna.

In the middle of the 14th century, Gotland entered a period of decline and turmoil, and suffered a loss of trade from which the island would never recover. No new churches were built on the island after around 1350. In Visby, only Visby Cathedral was maintained, while other churches, of which there were at least twelve, were left to decay. The systematic study of the churches on Gotland began in the 19th century.

== Background ==
The Christianisation of Scandinavia, whereby Norse religion was gradually replaced by Christianity, began in the 9th century. During the 11th century, a church organisation with bishops and dioceses was established, and Norse religion was finally abandoned. Gotland became a part of the Diocese of Linköping, probably during the middle of the 12th century, and would remain so until the creation of the Diocese of Visby in 1572. Thanks to its location within the Baltic Sea, Gotland benefited economically from an increase in trade between Eastern and Western Europe during the Middle Ages giving the inhabitants the financial means to construct large, prestigious churches.

The first churches on Gotland were wooden stave churches, but they were used for a relatively short time before stone churches began to replace them. Traces of around ten stave churches have been found on Gotland. The most well-preserved remains are those of Hemse Stave Church, whose timber had been re-used as floor boards in a later stone church. Wooden churches were built over a time span of a bit less than 100 years, c. 1120–1200. These first churches were probably not parish churches in the modern sense, but erected on private initiative adjacent to rich farmsteads by members of the local elite. (However, Gotland differed from much of Europe in that there was no land-owning aristocracy of the island.) Later, church building became a communal undertaking, where several peasants joined forces to finance a church. In the Hanseatic town of Visby the situation differed from that in the countryside. There, many of the churches were constructed by religious orders, confraternities or foreign merchants; present-day Visby Cathedral originally served the German traders of the city. More churches were eventually built in Visby than in any other city in medieval Sweden, and there were at least 12 churches within the city wall. Only Visby Cathedral remains, the rest having been preserved as ruins only.

== Architecture ==
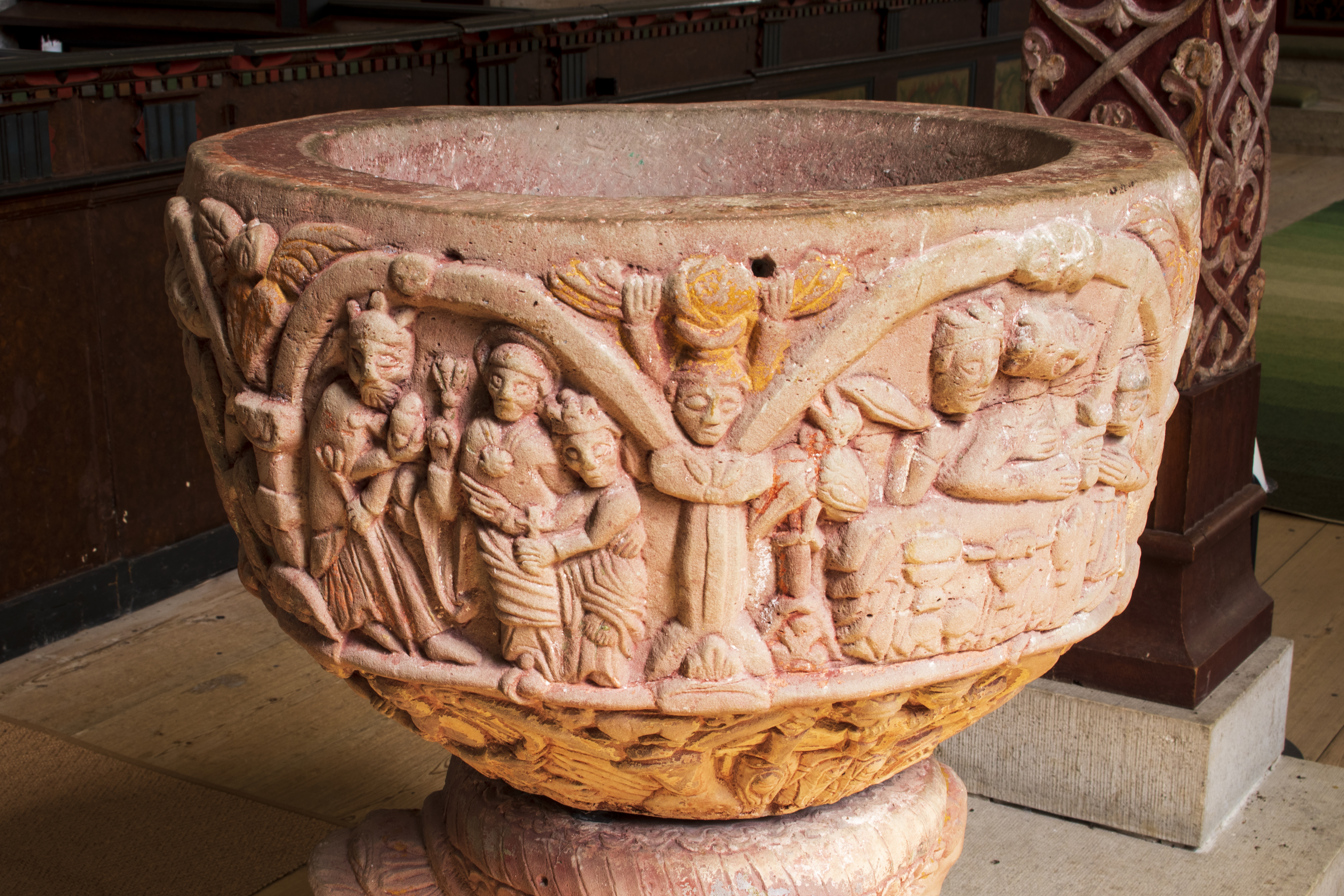
Several decorated Romanesque baptismal fonts, such as this by Hegvald in Stånga Church, have been preserved on Gotland.

The first stone churches on Gotland were built in the first half of the 12th century. They were simple Romanesque churches. They were constructed without a socle or base, and had undecorated, narrow, round-arched portals. Sometimes they were decorated with friezes of reliefs depicting religious or possibly mythological subjects; some of these have been preserved by being re-used and incorporated in later, Gothic structures. These earliest churches display stylistic influences from both Western and Eastern Europe, the latter especially evident in the Russo-Byzantine church murals in Garde Church. During the second half of the 12th century, stylistic tendencies shifted decisively towards Western Europe. The construction site of Lund Cathedral in Scania spread influences from present-day Germany. The establishment of the Cistercian Roma Abbey on Gotland in 1164 would have a lasting influence on church architecture on Gotland, which came to incorporate several elements from Cistercian architecture. These include both certain notable details, such as chancels lacking apses, with straight walls facing east containing three lancet windows, but also a general tendency towards a relatively austere architecture. Inside, these churches were probably all decorated with murals, but very few of these have been preserved. A greater number of Romanesque furnishings have been preserved. Workshops specialising in making sculpted baptismal fonts were established on Gotland during the 12th century and not only supplied the churches on Gotland with decorated fonts, but also exported fonts to the entire Baltic region. Several of these workshops have been given notnames by later art historians, such as Majestatis and Byzantios, while other labels, such as Sigraf and Hegvald, derive from inscriptions found on the fonts. A number of wooden sculptures have also been preserved from this time, including the Viklau Madonna, one of the most well-preserved 12th-century wooden sculptures in Europe, and a number of rood crosses from the same workshop.

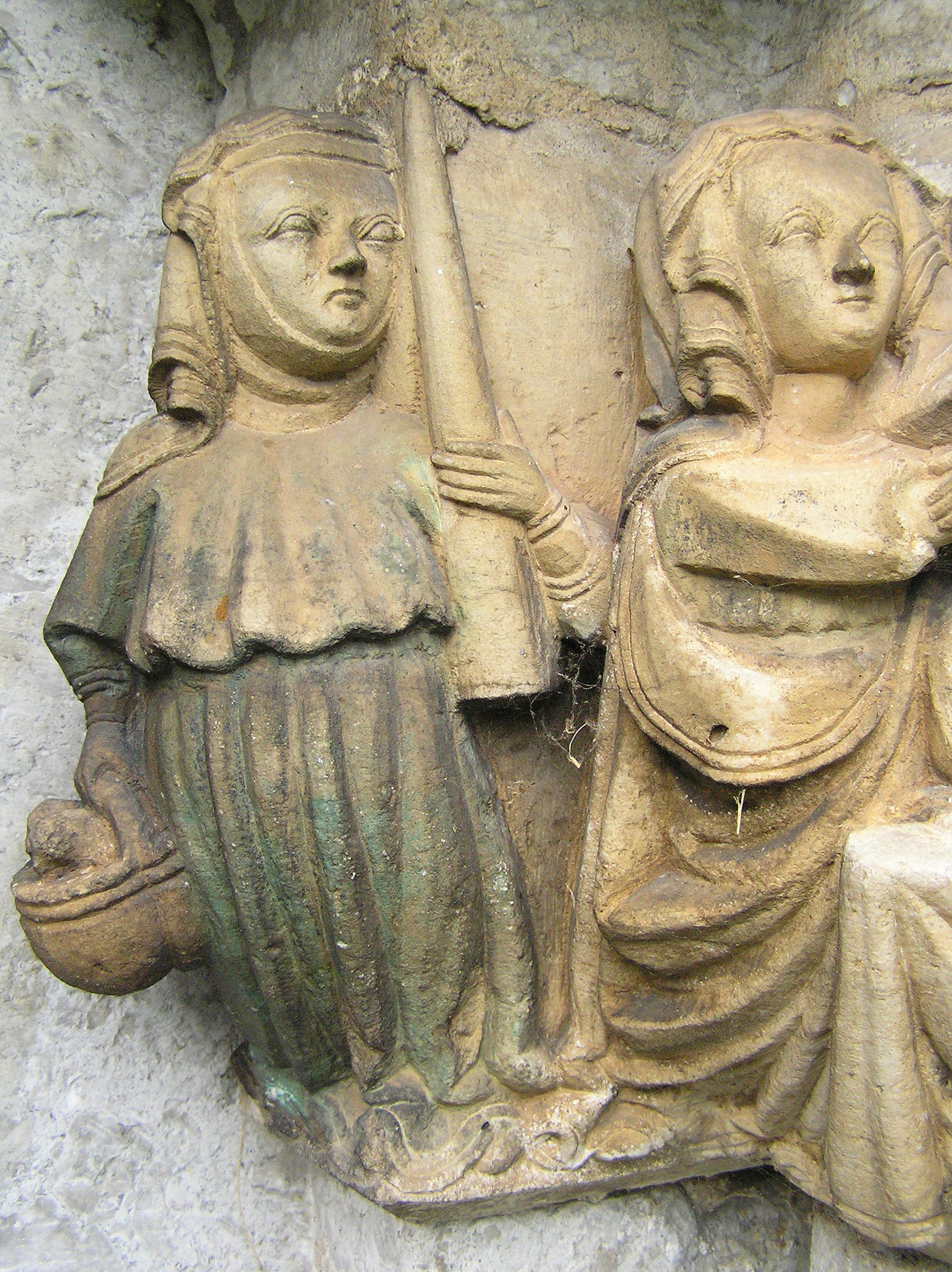
During the 14th century, the church portals were often decorated with figures, such as these at Martebo Church which still have traces of the original paint.

A boom in church building began on Gotland around 1225. New churches were erected and older churches were rebuilt. During this period, a local variant of Gothic architecture would replace the earlier Romanesque style. The churches became considerably larger, with vaults supported by pillars and divided into several bays. Apses were no longer built. Another peculiarity is that the north side of the churches almost always lacked windows; whether for practical, religious or superstitious reasons is not known. Stylistically, a conservative Early Gothic style, still strongly reminiscent of Romanesque through its heavy volumes and often round arches, would prevail until the end of the 13th century. Influences came from Westphalia, conveyed via Visby, an indication of the trade connections of the time. At the end of the 13th and early 14th century the style shifted towards what is often referred to as High Gothic In contrast to earlier churches, these churches have decidedly Gothic forms such as larger, pointed arch windows and more slender pillars supporting higher vaults. Several of them are decorated with murals. Also more stained glass windows are preserved from this period, and the churches of Gotland contain the largest amount of medieval stained glass in Sweden, with Lye Church containing the largest intact set in the Nordic countries. From c. 1320 until around 1360, the last great building period took place on Gotland. Stylistically, there is a change towards a heavier architecture, which in Swedish literature sometimes is referred to as "counter-Gothic" (kontragotik). While purely Gothic in details such as windows and portals, the architecture does not strive for lighter volumes and soaring heights, with walls dissolved into large expanses of windows supported by buttresses and pilasters. Structurally, the churches instead again tended towards more closed-in, darker spaces and heavier volumes. During the entire Gothic period, the main portals of the churches were often richly decorated. During the Early and High Gothic period, this decoration often consisted of stylised floral decoration. During the 14th century, the decoration became more profuse and also narrative, often depicting religious or mythological scenes on the capitals of the portal columns. These sculptures were originally painted in vivid colours. The church towers erected during this period are also considerably taller than before. A single workshop, today known by its notname as Egypticus after some of the sculptures that have features vaguely reminiscent of the art of ancient Egypt, appears to have been employed in a large number of churches.

In the middle of the 14th century, Gotland entered a period of economic decline and a loss in trade from which it would never recover. At the same time, the Black Death struck Gotland in 1350. The invasion of Gotland by Valdemar IV of Denmark and the Battle of Visby (1361) led to further disruptions. All these factors appear to have contributed to decreasing building activity, even though it remains difficult to pinpoint exact causes and effects in the building histories of individual churches. Many churches were left unfinished, and the abrupt halt in construction is often still visible in the buildings. Archaeologist Anders Andrén writes that it is "as if the stone masons had left the construction site for the day and never returned". Many churches on Gotland thus have a peculiar form, where often the chancel is disproportionally large in comparison with the rest of the church. In such cases, a planned reconstruction of the entire church had started during the 14th century with the chancel, but was brought to a halt before the whole reconstruction scheme could be finished.

After the second half of the 14th century, no new churches were built on Gotland. Inside, some churches did receive further embellishment in the form of new altarpieces or murals into the 15th and 16th centuries. Following the Reformation, changes in the liturgy led to the installation of new types of fittings, including pulpits and different kinds of altarpieces. Many altarpieces were made locally in Burgsvik during the 17th century and today often give a Baroque touch to the medieval churches. While the churches on Gotland have attracted interest since at least the 17th century, a more scientific approach to them started only during the 19th century. Art historian Johnny Roosval presented a first systematic study in Die Kirchen Gotlands ("The churches of Gotland"), published in German in 1911. Roosval dated the different churches on Gotland mainly on stylistic grounds. The timeline he established has subsequently been revised in individual cases, both by Roosval and by others. Overall, Roosval's assumptions about the age of the churches on Gotland are still widely accepted. Archaeological examinations in connection with renovations of the churches in particular during the 20th century served to further tweak the dates in individual cases but also to confirm the overall timeline. In a few cases where contemporary scientific methods have been used to examine the churches, radiocarbon dating and to a lesser extent dendrochronology have also lent some support to the established timeline.

== The churches ==
Name	Location	Image	Notes
Akebäck Church	Akebäck; 57°32′50″N 18°23′32″E	(More images)	Akebäck Church is an unusually well-preserved Romanesque church, possibly inaugurated in 1149. The nave, chancel and apse were built at the end of the 12th century, the tower slightly later. Only the sacristy is significantly later, constructed in 1931. A picture stone was found immured in one of the walls in the 1930s, and is today displayed outside the church. The altarpiece is from the 17th century but contains fragments of an earlier altarpiece.
Ala Church	Ala; 57°25′08″N 18°38′07″E	(More images)	The oldest part of Ala Church is the nave, which has an upper floor that appears to have functioned as a defensive structure, built around 1170–1180. The tower was erected around 1240. The current chancel replaced an earlier chancel and apse around 1250. The tower spire was designed in the 18th century. In 1938 a fire destroyed much of the church, which was repaired and rebuilt without altering the structure. It was re-inaugurated in 1940.
Alskog Church	Alskog; 57°19′53″N 18°37′37″E	(More images)	The first church was probably a wooden church. The oldest part of the now-visible church is the Romanesque nave, from the first quarter of the 13th century. It was followed by the construction of the tower in the second quarter of the same century. The Gothic chancel was constructed c. 1300. Its south portal is decorated in a style similar to the south portal of Garde Church. Fragments of murals by the Passion Master as well as a few medieval stained glass windows remain in the church. The rood cross, probably made by a German artist, is from the last quarter of the 12th century. The church contains several other medieval pieces of art, including four wooden statuettes, a baptismal font, a censer, a bell, candelabra and collection trays made of oak.
Alva Church	Alva; 57°12′27″N 18°21′41″E	(More images)	The nave and chancel of Alva Church are in a late Romanesque style, built in the early 13th century. The tower was erected approximately 100 years later. It was originally intended to be taller but for some reason it was never finished. Alva Church contains church murals from 1520, and a large rood cross from the middle of the 13th century.
Anga Church	Anga; 57°28′49″N 18°42′23″E	(More images)	Anga Church is an early Romanesque church with an apse. It was probably preceded by a wooden church. It was constructed at the end of the 12th century, inaugurated in 1200. Construction continued during the 13th century and a new consecration seems to have taken place in 1286. The altarpiece is from c. 1370. The walls are decorated with church murals from the 15th century. The church was pillaged by Russian troops in 1717. The sacristy was added at the beginning of the 19th century. A large renovation was carried out 1946–47.
Ardre Church	Ardre; 57°22′46″N 18°41′48″E	(More images)	Ardre Church is one of the smallest churches on Gotland. The church dates from the 13th century and replaced an earlier, Romanesque church built during the 12th century. The portal of the chancel is the only thing that remains from the first church. Medieval stained glass windows have been preserved in the chancel. The altarpiece is from the 14th century, while both the baptismal font and the rood cross are from the 13th century. The church also possesses a wooden Madonna from around 1500. The interior was heavily restored by Axel Haig between 1900 and 1902; Haig also designed the church organ.
Atlingbo Church	Atlingbo; 57°28′47″N 18°23′26″E	(More images)	The Gutasaga mentions a church in Atlingbo. A first, wooden church was probably constructed in the 11th century. The presently visible church, however, dates from the 13th century. During the Middle Ages it was a so-called "asylum church" (Asylkyrka); i.e. a church where persons accused of having committed crimes were entitled to seek refuge for some time. It contains a baptismal font by Byzantios (12th century). Its altarpiece was made in the 17th century, as was the pulpit (1693).
Barlingbo Church	Barlingbo; 57°33′52″N 18°27′47″E	(More images)	The extant, Gothic church replaced an earlier, Romanesque church. The oldest part is the chancel and the sacristy, from the early 13th century. The nave is from the middle of the same century, and its vaults and the tower date from c. 1280. The church contains medieval murals from several different periods, the oldest dating from the construction period of the chancel. The baptismal font is of an unusual design, unlike any other on Gotland. It is richly decorated with religious imagery, including the symbols of the Four Evangelists and their names carved in runes.
Björke Church	Björke; 57°30′26″N 18°25′16″E	(More images)	Björke Church was built during the 13th century. The chancel was enlarged during the 14th century, but a planned tower was never constructed. The church contains a number of medieval furnishings, including the baptismal font, the rood cross, wooden sculptures and the church tabernacle. The pulpit is also one of the oldest on Gotland, from 1594.
Boge Church	Boge; 57°41′13″N 18°45′46″E	(More images)	The chancel with the sacristy are the oldest parts of the church, constructed in an Early Gothic style in the middle of the 13th century. The wide and short nave is from the second half of the same century, and replaced an earlier nave. The medieval tower was destroyed in an 1857 storm and a new tower was built between 1867 and 1892. The vaults of the church were also damaged when the tower collapsed, and replaced in 1925. The church contains murals from two different time periods: the middle of the 13th century and the middle of the 15th century. Most of the furnishings are from the 18th century, but the plain baptismal font is from the 13th century.
Bro Church	Bro; 57°40′12″N 18°28′29″E	(More images)	Bro Church lies on what was probably previously a pagan sacred site. The presently visible church was built in stages between the early 13th century and the end of the 14th century, and is one of the most well-preserved medieval churches on Gotland. An unusual Romanesque frieze is immured in the facade. It was probably salvaged from an earlier church on the same site. The interior is decorated with several medieval murals. The church also has a baptismal font made by the sculptor Sigraf. Several of the other furnishings are Baroque in style.
Bunge Church	Bunge; 57°51′13″N 19°01′24″E	(More images)	The oldest part of the church is the tower, built in the 12th century. The nave and chancel are from the 14th century, and are in a High Gothic style. The churchyard is surrounded by a wall which originally had a defensive purpose, and the church door still bears marks from crossbow bolts. The whole church may have been fortified by the Teutonic Order when they ruled over Gotland. The church is decorated with murals, including one set depicting fighting knights from the late 14th century or early 15th century.
Burs Church	Burs; 57°14′44″N 18°30′31″E	(More images)	The disproportionately small nave is the oldest part of Burs Church, built at the beginning of the 13th century. The large tower, supported by unusually shaped buttresses, dates from the middle of the same century. The chancel was constructed in the 14th century, probably by Egypticus, replacing a Romanesque chancel and apse. The sacristy was probably added in the late Middle Ages. The chancel portal is richly decorated, and the chancel also still has some remaining stained glass window panes in its windows. The altarpiece is an elaborate piece of art of German origin, dating from the first half of the 15th century. The chancel also contains a decorated built-in Gothic choir stall made of limestone, which still has traces of the original paint.
Buttle Church	Buttle; 57°24′09″N 18°31′48″E	(More images)	The chancel and the nave date from the 12th century, while the tower was added during the 13th century. In the 14th century the chancel was somewhat altered. An extensive renovation was made in the 1880s, when the medieval windows were replaced with the current ones. The church contains 15th-century murals by the Passion Master and contains several medieval furnishings, including the 12th-century rood cross, the altarpiece from the 15th century and the baptismal font from the 13th century.
Bäl Church	Bäl; 57°38′41″N 18°37′58″E	(More images)	Bäl Church dates from the early 14th century. A taller tower was originally projected but never constructed. The chancel is probably somewhat older than the nave, as the chancel portal is Romanesque in style while the nave portal is a decorated Early Gothic portal. Some medieval sculptures belong to the church, while the altarpiece is from 1669 and the pulpit from 1722.
Dalhem Church	Dalhem; 57°33′08″N 18°32′02″E	(More images)	The church is built in a transitional style between Romanesque and Gothic, and displays many features typical for the churches on Gotland such as three lancet windows in the east wall, the lack of an apse, and the Early Gothic portals receding inwards with nested columns and decorated capitals. Some of the details of the oldest parts are similar to elements in Visby Cathedral. It was heavily restored between 1899 and 1914.
Eke Church	Eke; 57°10′04″N 18°22′45″E	(More images)	The remains of an earlier stave church have been discovered under the floor of Eke Church. The current stone church has a nave and chancel built during the 13th century, and a tower from the 14th century. It is richly decorated with murals, dating from the 13th and 15th centuries respectively; the latter come from the workshop of the Passion Master. The baptismal font is a work by Sigraf. The church also contains a 16th-century Madonna.
Ekeby Church	Ekeby; 57°35′44″N 18°30′52″E	(More images)	The base of the tower of Ekeby Church is all that remains of an earlier Romanesque church, constructed at the end of the 12th century. The nave and chancel were built at the end of the 13th century, and the tower was probably raised to its current height at the same time. Both south portals are decorated with plant ornaments, one of them also containing traces of original colour. The interior is richly decorated with murals, from the 13th, 15th, 18th and 19th centuries. The rood cross is from the late 12th century, and probably belonged to the earlier Romanesque church. From the same period is also the decorated baptismal font, possibly a work by Majestatis. The altarpiece is from 1708, the pulpit from 1741 and the pews from the late 17th century but decorated during the 18th century. The church organ facade is from 1858.
Eksta Church	Eksta; 57°17′11″N 18°12′23″E	(More images)	The church in Eksta was thoroughly altered in 1838, when it was rebuilt into a lighter and larger church building. The medieval tower is the oldest part of the church, built during the first half of the 13th century together with the walls of the nave, although these were raised in 1838. The chancel was erected in the 14th century and its former portal was moved to the nave during the reconstruction of the church in the 19th century. The interior retains little of its medieval appearance. Of the furnishings, the baptismal font and the altarpiece both date from the 17th century.
Endre Church	Endre; 57°36′36″N 18°27′55″E	(More images)	A Romanesque church with an apse existed here before the current church was built, and the base of the tower remains of this first stone church. Reconstruction began in the early 13th century; the decorated north portal dates from this time. New reconstruction works started again already in the middle of the same century, when a new chancel and a sacristy were constructed. The tower was raised in the middle of the 14th century, and the nave also dates from this time. The church contains murals from the 15th century by the Passion Master, discovered under lime wash and restored in 1915. The chancel contains an unusually large amount of medieval stained glass, compared to other churches on Gotland. These were supplemented with new windows in 1915–1916. The altarpiece is from the 14th century, and the rood cross from c. 1200. The baptismal font is from the late 12th century, in the style of Hegvald, complete with a lid from the 13th century. Other furnishings are from the 17th century (pulpit) and the 18th century (pews). The organ is from 1916.
Eskelhem Church	Eskelhem; 57°29′22″N 18°12′35″E	(More images)	The foundations of a wooden church have been found under the floor of Eskelhem Church. The wooden church was later replaced by a Romanesque church with an apse, which in turn has been replaced by the current, Gothic church. The walls of the nave and a finely decorated portal, since incorporated in the tower, are the only remains of the Romanesque church. The tower was built in the middle of the 13th century, and the chancel is from the middle of the 14th century. The vaults of the nave contain murals from the second half of the 13th century, and fragments of 15th-century murals by the Passion Master. The tower also contains an unusual fragment of a painted calendar, with the feast days written in Latin and runes. The rood and baptismal font are medieval, the latter by Byzantios. The altarpiece is from the 18th century, and the pulpit from the 17th century.
Etelhem Church	Etelhem; 57°20′14″N 18°29′45″E	(More images)	The oldest part of the church in Etelhem is the tower, erected in the beginning of the 13th century. The nave and chancel are from the 14th century. The church contains medieval murals from several different periods, including murals by the Passion Master. The baptismal font was made by a Romanesque stone sculptor known as Hegvald and probably belonged to an earlier church on the same site. The rood cross is from the 14th century and the sandstone altarpiece was made in Burgsvik in 1690.
Fardhem Church	Fardhem; 57°15′20″N 18°20′29″E	(More images)	Fardhem Church is a well-preserved Romanesque church. The chancel and the apse are the oldest parts, built at the end of the 12th century. The nave was constructed c. 1200 and the tower during the second quarter of the 13th century. The sacristy is the only more recent addition, built in 1871–1872 to designs by Axel Haig. The chancel portal from the late 12th century contains some unusual reliefs, in style not comparable to any other known sculpture on Gotland. The furnishings of the church all date from the time after the Reformation.
Fide Church	Fide; 57°04′25″N 18°18′58″E	(More images)	With the exception of the roof lantern, Fide Church in its entirety dates from the 13th century. Inside, the church is decorated with murals from both the early and the late 15th century. The furnishings include a 15th-century altarpiece and a rood cross from the 13th century. The pulpit is one of the oldest on Gotland, from 1587.
Fleringe Church	Fleringe; 57°52′10″N 18°52′37″E	(More images)	The chancel and nave of Fleringe Church appear to have been built simultaneously, probably during the second quarter of the 13th century. The tower was added in the third quarter of the same century. The church was badly damaged by fire in 1676, and no medieval furnishings remain. The wooden altarpiece is from 1701, the pulpit from 1726. The baptismal font originally belonged to the chapel of Visborg Castle. Adjacent to the church, the cemetery wall, the medieval lych gate and the former church stables are all preserved, forming an unusually well-preserved ensemble displaying how the surroundings of many of the churches on Gotland may originally have looked.
Fole Church	Fole; 57°39′02″N 18°32′41″E	(More images)	The church tower of Fole Church is similar to that of Bro Church and is the oldest part of the church, built around 1200. Together with a portal that is today incorporated in the chancel, it is all that remains of an earlier Romanesque church. The rest of the church was rebuilt at the middle of the 13th century, and inaugurated in 1280. The chancel and the easternmost part of the nave are in a transitional style between Romanesque and Gothic, while the west end of the nave is in a purely Gothic style. Inside, the church has a rood cross from the middle of the 13th century and a decorated baptismal font from the first half of the same century; it was painted in 1707.
Follingbo Church	Follingbo; 57°34′56″N 18°23′0″E	(More images)	The nave and tower are from the early 13th century. They are some of the best examples of Romanesque architecture on Gotland. The chancel was probably replaced with the current chancel at the end of the 13th century. The chancel, Gothic in style, is also unusually skillfully constructed. The only more recent addition is the sacristy, from 1821. Inside, the flat wooden ceiling is richly decorated with paintings from the 17th century. Among the furnishings, the pulpit is from the early 17th century and originally belonged to the church of Visborg Castle, and was moved to the church when the castle was demolished. The altarpiece is from the 1740s, the pews are from the 17th century and the baptismal font is medieval.
Fröjel Church	Fröjel; 57°20′08″N 18°11′23″E	(More images)	Fröjel Church is located in a strategic location on the coast, and a ruined defensive tower adjacent to the church indicates that the site has been used for defensive purposes. The nave is the oldest part of the church, from the end of the 12th century. In the early 13th century, a tower was erected, the disproportionately large chancel was built c. 1300. A rood cross is also preserved from the same period. The foot of the baptismal font is a work by Byzantios, from the 12th century, while its basin is from the 14th century. The sandstone altarpiece was made in 1634 by Peter van Eghen. The church contains several murals from the early 14th century.
Fårö Church	Fårö; 57°54′56″N 19°08′0″E	(More images)	Fårö Church dates from the Middle Ages but retains little of its medieval appearance. Its current appearance is largely the result of reconstruction works made in 1859. The church contains two paintings, from 1618 and 1767 respectively, made in memory of seal hunters who had become isolated on drifting ice sheets but were ultimately saved. Filmmaker Ingmar Bergman and his wife Ingrid von Rosen are buried in the cemetery of the church.
Gammelgarn Church	Gammelgarn; 57°24′16″N 18°48′16″E	(More images)	The oldest part of the now-visible church is the tower, the only remaining part of an earlier, Romanesque church. The nave, chancel and sacristy were built during the first half of the 14th century. Adjacent to the church there is also the ruins of a defensive tower from the 12th century. Architecturally, Gammelgarn Church is one of the richest churches on Gotland. Particularly the southern nave portal is profusely decorated in a style ascribed to the workshop known by the notname Egypticus. The interior contains fragments of 15th-century murals by the so-called Passion Master. The altarpiece is a work from the 14th century.
Ganthem Church	Ganthem; 57°30′57″N 18°34′54″E	(More images)	The chancel and the apse, in Romanesque style, date from the late 12th century and are the oldest parts of Ganthem Church. The rest of the church is also Romanesque, but constructed towards the middle of the 13th century. The interior of the church is characterised by the 15th-century murals which decorate the church walls. Several of the furnishings are medieval: the baptismal font is from the 12th century, the rood cross is from c. 1200, and the altarpiece is a copy of a 14th-century altarpiece today in the Swedish History Museum in Stockholm.
Garde Church	Garde; 57°19′02″N 18°34′56″E	(More images)	Garde Church is one of the oldest churches on Gotland. Together with its cemetery and its four lychgates, it constitutes one of the most well-preserved medieval church ensembles in Sweden. Construction of the church probably began c. 1130. The nave and tower are Romanesque, the considerably larger chancel was constructed by Egypticus during the first half of the 14th century. The church contains unusual murals depicting two male saints, Russo-Byzantine in style. Similarities have been pointed out between these and murals in the Russian churches of Nereditsa and St. George in Staraya Ladoga. The baptismal font is by Byzantios, from the late 12th century.
Gerum Church	Gerum; 57°17′40″N 18°19′46″E	(More images)	The chancel and the apse are the oldest intact parts of the church, built at the end of the 12th century. The rest of the church is from the 13th century. The tower was never finished. The interior is decorated with murals from three different periods. The decorated baptismal font is from the 12th century, probably a work by the sculptor Majestatis. The church owns three medieval crosses, including the rood cross from the 12th century. The altarpiece and the pulpit are both from the 17th century. The church also contains one of the oldest still-working church bells on Gotland, made sometime before 1250.
Gothem Church	Gothem; 57°34′31″N 18°44′06″E	(More images)	Gothem Church is one of the largest churches on Gotland. Its oldest part is the chancel and the apse, built at the beginning of the 13th century. The nave is slightly later, and the tower was erected in two stages between the late 13th century and the middle of the 14th century. The interior of the church contains several medieval murals which were discovered and restored in 1950. They were probably made by a German artist and date from c. 1300. The church also contains a medieval choir stall. The altarpiece was donated to the church in 1689 and the pulpit is from 1709.
Grötlingbo Church	Grötlingbo; 57°08′01″N 18°20′47″E	(More images)	A Romanesque church was built in Grötlingbo around 1200, and several elements of this church have been preserved in the currently -isible church, which is later. Notably a set of stone reliefs, possibly recounting some heroic myth, have been immured in the facade of the church. Stylistically, they have been connected with the sculptor known as Sigraf. The oldest part of the current church is the tower, which dates from the first half of the 13th century. The nave and chancel are from the 14th century, built by the workshop known as Egypticus. Characteristic sculptures adorn the south portal of the church. The nave is three bays wide, and its vaults supported by four pillars. Typically for Gotland churches, the north wall is devoid of windows. The chancel contains medieval murals and some stained glass window panes from the 14th century. The baptismal font is from the 12th century and the rood cross from the 13th century. The pulpit is the oldest on Gotland, from 1548. Originally it belonged to Visby Cathedral.
Guldrupe Church	Guldrupe; 57°25′49″N 18°25′35″E	(More images)	A few planks from a stave church, decorated in a style reminiscent of Viking art, have been found in Guldrupe. It was replaced by a stone church during the late 12th century, of which the nave is still preserved. The tower was added in the first half of the 13th century and the chancel and sacristy were added at the end of the same century. There were plans to replace the old nave, but these were never executed. The interior is decorated with a few decorative murals. The baptismal font is from the 12th century, decorated by the sculptor Byzantios. The pulpit is from the late 17th century and the pews from the 18th century.
Hablingbo Church	Hablingbo; 57°11′14″N 18°15′45″E	(More images)	Hablingbo Church is one of the largest churches on Gotland. The oldest part is the Romanesque tower, from the late 12th or early 13th century. The nave and chancel are Gothic in style and built in the middle of the 14th century. The sacristy was added in 1730. All the portals of the church, including a Romanesque portal incorporated from an earlier nave, are richly decorated with sculptures. The Gothic portals of the nave and chancel have been attributed to the workshop called Egypticus. Inside, the chancel contains fragments of 15th-century murals. The comparatively large altarpiece is from 1643 and made by Peter van Eghen and his son Gert van Eghen. The pulpit is from the end of the 17th century.
Hall Church	Hall; 57°53′31″N 18°42′57″E	(More images)	Hall Church was built in the early 13th century. It contains several sets of medieval murals, partially from the construction period and partially from the 14th century. The church contains a baptismal font from the 13th century and the altarpiece and the pulpit are from the 17th century.
Halla Church	Halla; 57°30′39″N 18°29′50″E	(More images)	The nave was constructed c. 1200 and is the oldest part of the church in Halla. The considerably larger chancel was built during the middle of the 14th century, and so was the sacristy. Inside, the chancel is decorated with murals from the 15th and 16th centuries. The ceiling of the nave is a painted wooden ceiling from 1697. The baptismal font is a work by the Romanesque sculptor Hegvald, made in the 12th century. Another medieval item in the church is the rood cross, an imported piece of art made in the middle of the 15th century. The altarpiece and the pulpit are from the 17th century.
Hamra Church	Hamra; 56°58′33″N 18°18′48″E	(More images)	Hamra Church has a complex building history and was initially in the 13th century planned as a basilica, three bays wide. Its present shape is the result of rebuilding which occurred during the 14th century. It contains several medieval wooden sculptures, as well as murals from both the 15th and 18th centuries.
Hangvar Church	Hangvar; 57°50′21″N 18°41′18″E	(More images)	The church in Hangvar was built in the middle of the 13th century, or soon thereafter. The nave and the chancel are the oldest parts, in a transitional style between Romanesque and Gothic, and the tower is Early Gothic in style. The baptismal font of the church is probably from the construction period, while both the pulpit and the altarpiece are from the 17th century.
Havdhem Church	Havdhem; 57°09′45″N 18°19′23″E	(More images)	The oldest part of the church in Havdhem is the nave and chancel, erected in the early 12th century. At the end of the same century, the apse was added. The apse is clearly influenced by the architecture of Lund Cathedral, which was an important building site at the time. At some point, possibly after a fire in 1580, the nave was enlarged and its ceiling raised. The tower is from the middle of the 13th century. The altarpiece of the church is from 1667 and the pulpit from 1679. The rood cross is from the 15th century.
Hejde Church	Hejde; 57°24′46″N 18°20′45″E	(More images)	The tower and the nave are the oldest parts of the church in Hejde, built during the middle of the 13th century. The considerably larger chancel is from the middle of the 14th century, and was probably intended to be followed by a new nave and tower as well. Both south portals of the church are decorated with stone sculpture, the choir portal being the most unusual in comparison with other churches on Gotland. Inside the church vaults are decorated with ornamental murals from the middle of the 13th century and from the 14th century. Well-preserved stained glass windows are preserved in the chancel. The rood cross is from the 16th century, probably made in northern Germany. The sandstone altarpiece is from 1684 and was made in Burgsvik. The baptismal font is a decorated Romanesque font, made by Byzantios.
Hejdeby Church	Hejdeby; 57°37′49″N 18°26′34″E	(More images)	The chancel and the nave are Romanesque in style and constructed during the first years of the 13th century. The tower was added at the end of the same century and is Gothic in style. Inside the church there are murals from both the 13th and the 15th centuries. Both the rood cross and the baptismal font are from the 13th century. Both the pulpit and the pews are from the 18th century.
Hejnum Church	Hejnum; 57°40′48″N 18°37′55″E	(More images)	A considerably smaller, Romanesque church was built on the site of the present building around 1200. Sculpted reliefs from this church have been immured in the facade of the later church, which was constructed in the middle of the 13th century. The tower is slightly older. Ornamental murals decorate the vaults of the nave and the chancel. Figurative murals are also preserved in the chancel. The altarpiece dates from 1738, and the pulpit is also from the 18th century. The rood cross is from the early 13th century.
Hellvi Church	Hellvi; 57°46′30″N 18°53′42″E	(More images)	The church tower is Romanesque, while the rest of the church is Early Gothic in style and constructed in the middle of the 13th century. The tower was probably originally taller, but the upper part collapsed at some point. The portal of the chancel contains an inscription in runes, stating that the church was built by Lafrans Botvidarson from Eskelhem. The furnishings include an altarpiece from the early 18th century and a pulpit from the 17th century.
Hemse Church	Hemse; 57°13′58″N 18°22′22″E	(More images)	There was a wooden stave church from the early 12th century in Hemse before the first stone church was constructed. The remains of the stave church are today preserved in Gotland Museum in Visby. The present church was built in the 13th century. Inside, the church contains medieval murals from several different periods. The rood cross is a work from the 12th century, the baptismal font from the 14th century. The sandstone altarpiece was donated to the church is 1699, and the pulpit was installed in 1768. The church bell is from the 15th century.
Hogrän Church	Hogrän; 57°30′16″N 18°18′28″E	(More images)	The tower of Hogrän Church was erected during the 13th century and is the oldest part of the church. The nave and chancel were probably erected c. 1300. They replaced an earlier structure. The altarpiece from 1638 is a work by Peter van Egher's workshop, while the rood cross from the 12th century is one of the oldest wooden sculptures on Gotland. All the doors of the church are furthermore probably medieval.
Hörsne Church	Hörsne-Bara; 57°33′30″N 18°35′50″E	(More images)	The oldest part of Hörsne Church is the tower, erected in the early 13th century. The chancel and the sacristy were built at the end of the 13th century, and the nave during the first half of the 14th century; both replaced earlier, Romanesque building parts. Both south portals of the church are richly decorated, the south portal of the nave has some of the most unusual sculptures on Gotland. It appears to be a work by the workshop known as Egypticus. Medieval murals were discovered in the church during a renovation in 1978–80 and subsequently restored. They mostly date from the 14th century. The altarpiece is an unusual mix of Gothic sculptures and a Baroque frame.
Klinte Church	Klinte; 57°22′42″N 18°13′55″E	(More images)	The lower part of the tower is the oldest part of Klinte Church, and the only remains of a Romanesque church which was gradually replaced with the presently visible structure during the 14th century. The large chancel portal is decorated with sculpted capitals. Inside, the chancel vault is decorated with murals from c. 1300. They are mostly ornamental but also contain a few figurative scenes. The rood cross is from the 15th century, the altarpiece from 1643 and the baptismal font from 1667.
Kräklingbo Church	Kräklingbo; 57°26′42″N 18°42′40″E	(More images)	The chancel with its square apse are the oldest parts of Kräklingbo Church, the only remains of a church which was consecrated in 1211. The nave, built c. 1300, replaced the nave of this earlier church. Both south portals of the church are decorated with sculptured floral ornaments and figures. Inside, the church is decorated with fragments from the 13th century. The altarpiece is from the 16th century and made on Gotland. The rood cross is a work from the 13th century.
Källunge Church	Källunge; 57°36′28″N 18°35′04″E	(More images)	Källunge Church belongs to the first group of stone churches built on Gotland, in the first half of the 12th century. Of this church, only the nave and tower remain. They are dwarfed by the chancel, erected in the first half of the 14th century and originally intended to be the first building stage of a complete rebuilding of the church. However, these plans were abandoned and instead the tower and the nave were somewhat altered to fit the large chancel better during the Gothic era. The richly decorated portal of the nave for example was probably originally intended to be part of a new tower. Inside, the nave contains fragments of Romanesque murals in a Byzantine style. The chancel is three bays wide; its vaults are supported by four pillars. The chancel also contains remains of later, Gothic murals. The altarpiece of the church is a north German piece of art from the early 16th century. The baptismal font is extremely worn but has been attributed to the Romanesque sculptor Byzantios. Other furnishings include the pulpit from the 18th century and the pews from the 17th century.
Lau Church	Lau; 57°16′58″N 18°37′12″E	(More images)	Lau Church is one of the largest churches on Gotland. The Romanesque nave is the oldest part of the church, built during the first half of the 13th century. The large Gothic chancel was added c. 1300. The church has four large portals, all decorated with sculptures. Inside, the nave is decorated with murals from the 1520s. The church windows also contain a few medieval stained glass window panes. The altarpiece is from the early 15th century, but re-painted in a different style in the 18th century. The rood cross from the middle of the 13th century is one of the largest in the Nordic countries. The baptismal font is very worn but has been attributed to the Romanesque sculptor Sigraf and dates from the late 12th century.
Levide Church	Levide; 57°16′55″N 18°15′59″E	(More images)	Levide Church is a largely Romanesue edifice, stylistically not comparable with any other church on Gotland. The oldest parts are the chancel and the apse, from the late 12th century. The nave appears to have been built at the beginning of the 13th century, and the tower was added in the middle of the same century. The church is a hall church, and appears to be constructed after German examples. Inside, the south wall of the nave is decorated with murals by the Passion Master, from the 15th century. Most of the furnishings are from the 17th century.
Linde Church	Linde; 57°16′46″N 18°22′47″E	(More images)	An entirely Romanesque church, construction of Linde Church began in the late 12th century with the chancel and the apse. The nave was added in the first years of the next century, and the tower erected towards the middle of the 13th century. A single Gothic window was installed in the 14th century. The chancel portal has also been altered at an unknown time. Both the main portal and the interior is reminiscent of the architecture of Tingstäde Church. The church contains murals from the 14th and 15th centuries. The altarpiece bears the date 1521. The rood cross is a copy; the original cross is now in Gotland Museum. The church unusually contains two bases of Romanesque baptismal fonts, one of which has been attributed to the artist Hegvald. The pulpit is from the late 17th century.
Lojsta Church	Lojsta; 57°18′46″N 18°23′02″E	(More images)	The nave and the chancel are the oldest parts of Lojsta Church. They date from the 13th century. During the early 14th century the tower was erected. The church contains several medieval murals from the 14th to the 16th centuries. Unusually, Lojsta Church also contains several medieval stained glass window panes from the 13th century. The baptismal font and the rood cross are both from the 12th century, while the altarpiece is from the middle of the 14th century, although it was painted in its present colours in 1896.
Lokrume Church	Lokrume; 57°41′16″N 18°32′19″E	(More images)	Lokrume Church appears to have replaced an earlier, Romanesque stone church. Reconstruction started around 1240 and when the tower was finished the church was consecrated in 1277. The church contains a rood cross from the 12th century, and a baptismal font possibly made by Majestatis. The altarpiece is from 1707.
Lummelunda Church	Lummelunda; 57°46′11″N 18°27′19″E	(More images)	As with several churches on Gotland, the nave is comparatively smaller and earlier than the chancel. The nave and tower are the oldest parts of the church, erected c. 1200. The chancel was built in the middle of the 14th century, replacing an earlier chancel. Inside, the church is richly decorated with murals. The arch between the tower and the nave has purely ornamental murals from the late 13th century. The chancel also has murals from the late 15th century. the ceiling of the nave was installed as late as 1961 during a renovation, and decorated in 1989. A single wooden sculpture from around 1500 is preserved in the chancel, depicting Saint Anthony. Most other furnishings are from the 17th century.
Lye Church	Lye; 57°17′52″N 18°31′34″E	(More images)	The oldest part of Lye Church is the nave, which dates from the last quarter of the 12th century. The tower is from the early 13th century. In the second quarter of the 14th century, the chancel was constructed, a work by Egypticus. Lye Church contains the largest set of preserved medieval stained glass windows in the Nordic countries, and these are also among the best preserved and of the highest quality. The church also contains medieval murals, and among the furnishings the altarpiece bears the date 1496. The rood cross is also from the late 15th century.
Lärbro Church	Lärbro; 57°47′13″N 18°47′37″E	(More images)	The chancel and the nave are the oldest parts of the church, from the end of the 13th century. The unusual tower was erected in the 1340s. Its octagonal shape, not found in any other church tower on Gotland, was originally taller but damaged in a storm in 1522. Its western portal is richly decorated. Also the chancel portal contains sculpted decorations. Inside, fragments of medieval murals remain. The altarpiece is from c. 1400, and the chancel also contains several medieval gravestones and a medieval chair. Close to the church are the ruins of a defensive tower from the 12th century, incorporated in the cemetery wall.
Martebo Church	Martebo; 57°44′55″N 18°29′31″E	(More images)	The tower, the oldest part of the church was built during the 13th century. In the following century the Gothic nave and chancel were constructed, by the workshop known as Egypticus. Its three Gothic portals are among the most richly decorated on Gotland. Inside, the church contains one of the oldest pulpits in Sweden, from the 16th century. The altarpiece is from 1675. During a renovation in the 1970s, medieval murals were discovered and restored.
Mästerby Church	Mästerby; 57°28′11″N 18°18′14″E	(More images)	Mästerby Church consists of a nave, chancel and apse built around 1200 and a tower added in the middle of the 13th century. The sacristy was added in 1790. The church contains several murals from many different periods, ranging from the 13th to the 17th centuries. The baptismal font is from the second half of the 12th century and attributed to Byzantios. The rood cross is from the early 13th century. The altarpiece was made in 1688, and the pulpit from the first half of the 18th century.
Norrlanda Church	Norrlanda; 57°30′05″N 18°39′34″E	(More images)	The part of Norrlanda Church that is oldest is the tower, erected in the 13th century. Originally it was attached to a Romanesque church built in the 12th century, but the nave and chancel were rebuilt in a Gothic style from the middle of the 14th century. The portal of the nave is among the most profusely decorated on Gotland, and made by Egypticus. Inside, the church is decorated with murals from the 15th century. Unusually, two medieval side altars have been preserved in addition to the main altar. Most of the furnishings date from the 18th century. Two of the medieval lych gates are preserved.
När Church	När; 57°15′26″N 18°37′30″E	(More images)	The tower of När Church contains arrowslits and was built to be able to serve in a defensive function. It is the oldest part of the church, built during the middle of the 13th century. The chancel and nave were added in the early 14th century. Both of the south portals are decorated with Gothic sculptures. Among the furnishings, the decorated baptismal font is the oldest, a work by the sculptor Hegvald from the 12th century. The rood cross is from the late Middle Ages. The pews and the pulpit are from the 17th century and the altarpiece was made in Burgsvik in 1703.
Näs Church	Näs; 57°06′36″N 18°15′44″E	(More images)	Näs Church was built in the 13th century. The tower was probably once higher than it is today. During a renovation in 1990, medieval murals were discovered and restored in the chancel. The appearance of the interior derives much of its character from a renovation made in 1910. The altarpiece of the church was made in Burgsvik in 1692, and the pulpit is from the 18th century. The church also contains a votive ship from the 1870s.
Othem Church	Othem; 57°44′50″N 18°44′19″E	(More images)	Othem Church was constructed in the 13th century and replaced an earlier stone church on the same site. The decoration of the capital of the pillar supporting the vault of the nave is very similar to that of Hellvi Church. The chancel is richly decorated with medieval murals from several different periods. The very worn baptismal font is a work by the 12th-century sculptor Sigraf.
Roma Church	Roma; 57°31′42″N 18°26′31″E	(More images)	The oldest part of Roma Church is probably the sacristy, which was attached to a chancel built in the 12th century. This church was replaced with the currently visible one approximately between 1215 and 1255. The church is a hall church. Its altarpiece dates from 1902, as do the pews. The undecorated baptismal font is from the 13th century, and the Late Baroque pulpit was donated in 1737. Outside the church there is a wooden steeple which contains three church bells, installed in 1929. They come from Gammalsvenskby in Ukraine.
Rone Church	Rone; 57°31′42″N 18°26′31″E	(More images)	A few fragments indicate that the present church was preceded by a smaller, Romanesque building. This was successively replaced by the nave and the chancel (c. 1300) and the tower (mid-14th century). The interior is decorated with murals from two periods; the 14th century and the 15th century (the latter by the so-called Passion Master). Six medieval window panes remain in the chancel windows, while the rest of the stained glass date from 1913 to 1915. A wooden sculpture from 1400 is one of the few medieval furnishings. The large altarpiece is from 1694, and the pulpit bears the date 1595, although it appears to have been painted later. The baptismal font is from 1664.
Rute Church	Rute; 57°50′01″N 18°55′24″E	(More images)	Rute Church was built in the 13th century, the nave and chancel are slightly older than the tower. The nave is decorated with murals by the Passion Master from the 15th century. The vaults of the church were decorated in the 13th century. The altarpiece is from the first half of the 17th century and bears the monogram of the Danish king Christian IV.
Sanda Church	Sanda; 57°25′45″N 18°13′24″E	(More images)	The current church was preceded by a smaller, Romanesque stone church. It was replaced by the currently visible church, which was built in stages between the early 13th century and the middle of the 14th century. The oldest part is the tower, followed by the nave. The last part of the church to be built was the chancel. Inside, the nave is decorated with murals from c. 1300 and from the 15th century. The oldest item in the church is the baptismal font, a work by the sculptor Byzantios from the late 12th century. The rood cross is from the 13th century. The altarpiece was made in Burgsvik and is from 1664. From the same century is also the pulpit.
Silte Church	Silte; 57°13′15″N 18°14′12″E	(More images)	Silte Church was built during the 13th century; the nave and chancel during the middle of the century, and the tower was built towards the end of it. The stone church was preceded by a wooden church on the same spot. The interior of the church contains medieval murals from three different periods and in one of the windows of the chancel, fragments of medieval stained glass survive. The decorated baptismal font is a work by the Romanesque sculptor Sigraf, and dates from the 12th century. The pulpit was installed in the 18th century.
Sjonhem Church	Sjonhem; 57°29′08″N 18°31′14″E	(More images)	The comparably short tower is the oldest part of Sjonhem Church. It was built in the 13th century as part of an earlier church. The nave and chancel of the church were however replaced in the middle of the 13th century. Inside, the church contains fragments of murals and a few original medieval stained glass window panes. The decorated baptismal font is a work by the sculptor Hegvald, who made it in the 12th century. Other furnishings include a crucifix from the 14th century, incorporated in an altarpiece from the 18th century. The pulpit is from the 17th century but painted in its current colours in the 1780s.
Sproge Church	Sproge; 57°15′13″N 18°12′39″E	(More images)	A few planks from a wooden church built during the 11th century have been preserved in Gotland Museum. The currently visible church was built during the early 13th century. The tower was built at the end of the same century. The interior of the church was substantially altered between 1839 and 1840. The only medieval item still in the church is the rood cross. The altarpiece is from the 17th century. The church also contains several medieval graves.
Stenkumla Church	Stenkumla; 57°32′51″N 18°16′06″E	(More images)	Fragmentary remains of a 12th-century stone church are preserved in the walls of the current church, which however is of later date. The tower is the oldest part, from the first half of the 13th century. The chancel was built c. 1250 but altered during the 14th century. The nave was built around 1300, and at the same time the tower was raised to its current height. The nave portal has a comparatively rich sculptural decoration. Fragments of medieval murals by the Passion Master as well as remains of medieval stained glass windows can be seen in the church. Of the furnishings, the rood cross is the oldest, made at the end of the 12th century. The pulpit, font and altarpiece are all from the 17th century. Two runestones are preserved in the ground floor of the tower.
Stenkyrka Church	Stenkyrka; 57°29′28″N 18°31′14″E	(More images)	Construction of the currently visible church in Stenkyrka began in the 13th century, replacing and to some extent reusing an earlier stone church. The chancel is the oldest part. It was followed by the nave, built only slightly later. The unusually large tower was built during the second half of the 13th century. The interior is decorated with several medieval murals, from several different periods. The decorated baptismal font is from the second half of the 12th century. The church is also in possession of a crucifix from the 14th century, while the altarpiece, the pulpit and the pews all are from the 17th century.
Stånga Church	Stånga; 57°16′59″N 18°27′57″E	(More images)	A first, wooden church was probably built here at a previously pagan sacred site. The first stone church was built during the first half of the 13th century, but of this only fragments remain visible. The nave was rebuilt in the middle of the 14th century, by Egypticus. The monumental limestone sculptures immured next the main portal on the south wall of the church, in a fashion not known from anywhere else on Gotland, imply that they were intended for another part of the church. The plan thus seems to have been to rebuild the entire church. The chancel and apse were rebuilt during the 1860s, but in the same Romanesque style as they had before these repairs. The sandstone altarpiece was made in Burgsvik during the second half of the 17th century. The baptismal font is one of the most well-preserved works by Hegvald and dates from the end of the 12th century. The rood is dated to c. 1250, the decorated pulpit from 1723.
Sundre Church	Sundre; 56°56′09″N 18°10′54″E	(More images)	Sundre Church is Romanesque in style. The chancel and the nave are the oldest parts of Sundre Church, dating from the first half of the 13th century. The tower was erected in the middle of the same century. The church owns a wooden Madonna from the 13th century and a rod cross from the 15th century. The altarpiece is a copy of a medieval altarpiece which is currently in Gotland Museum. The pulpit is from the 19th century.
Tingstäde Church	Tingstäde; 57°44′10″N 18°36′53″E	(More images)	The oldest part of Tingstäde Church is the Romanesque nave, to which a Gothic chancel was added in the 13th century, replacing an earlier chancel and apse. The tower was finished in the 14th century. All the portals of the church are Romanesque in style, the west portal of the tower is one of the most richly decorated Romanesque portals of any church on Gotland. Inside, the capital of the central pillar is also decorated with Romanesque sculpture. The church contains both medieval murals and murals from the 18th century. The church is in possession of a Gothic rood cross and a Romanesque baptismal font. The altarpiece and the pulpit are from the 18th century.
Tofta Church	Tofta; 57°31′17″N 18°10′07″E	(More images)	The lowest part of the tower dates from the early 13th century, and is the oldest part of Tofta Church. The nave and the chancel were built simultaneously in the middle of the 14th century, and the sacristy was added in 1881. Inside, fragments of medieval murals were uncovered in the 1950s. The decorated baptismal font is a Romanesque work from the late 12th century, while the altarpiece is from the middle of the 14th century and probably made in Lübeck. The other furnishings are mainly from the 17th and 18th centuries.
Träkumla Church	Träkumla; 57°33′37″N 18°18′46″E	(More images)	The entire church was built during the 13th century, and consecrated in 1287, but the tower was left unfinished. Only in 1917 was the current wooden spire added. During several years of the 19th century the church was abandoned. The church is decorated with murals by the Passion Master from the 15th century and has a number of medieval furnishings: the baptismal font (12th century) is by Byzantios, the altarpiece is from the 14th century and rood cross from the end of the Middle Ages.
Vall Church	Vall; 57°31′14″N 18°20′42″E	(More images)	In the early 13th century, the chancel, apse and nave of Vall Church were built. In the middle of the same century, construction of the tower started. It was not finished until the end of the century, however. The last addition to the church was probably the sacristy, from approximately the same time as the tower was finished. While all the portals of the church are Romanesque, especially the tower portal is elaborately decorated with stone sculptures. The decorated baptismal font is from the late 12th century, a work by Majestatis. The altarpiece is from 1684 and the pulpit is from the early 18th century.
Vallstena Church	Vallstena; 57°36′35″N 18°38′12″E	(More images)	The oldest parts of Vallstena Church are the Romanesque tower and the nave, which are from the early 13th century. The Gothic chancel and the sacristy are from the end of the 13th century and replaced an earlier chancel with an apse.
Vamlingbo Church	Vamlingbo; 56°58′10″N 18°13′49″E	(More images)	Vamlingbo Church was built in the middle of the 13th century, replacing an earlier stone church on the same spot. The tower was added during the 14th century but partially destroyed in a storm in 1817. The three-bay nave is richly decorated with murals, including one of the largest medieval murals on Gotland. It depicts the Archangel Michael weighing the soul of Emperor Henry and dates from the mid-13th century. Among the church furnishings, the decorated baptismal font is the oldest. It is a work by the Romanesque sculptor Byzantios. The altarpiece is from the 14th century. In addition, the church contains several memorial plaques and funerary monuments from the 17th and 18th centuries, commemorating the priests of the parish.
Viklau Church	Viklau; 57°27′56″N 18°27′23″E	(More images)	The church is a well-preserved though plain Romanesque church, slightly altered in the 19th century. It is most well known for its medieval furnishings, particularly a Romanesque Madonna from the 12th century which is today in the Swedish History Museum in Stockholm. A copy has been made for Viklau Church. In addition, the church has a rood cross from the 12th century and a decorated baptismal font by Hegvald.
Visby Cathedral	Visby; 57°38′30″N 18°17′51″E	(More images)	Visby Cathedral was originally built as the church of the German traders in Visby. After the Reformation, it became the only church of Visby; the many other churches of the city were left to decay. In 1572, when the Diocese of Visby was created, it became a cathedral. The oldest parts of the church are from the 12th century. The church has a complex building history with additions and alterations made during much of the Middle Ages. The wooden spires are however from the 18th century, and the church was furthermore renovated in a Neo-Gothic style 1899–1901. The main altarpiece dates from this time, while the pulpit is from 1684 and possibly made in Lübeck. The church contains several funerary monuments and memorials, and a 14th-century baptismal font.
Vänge Church	Vänge; 57°27′07″N 18°30′41″E	(More images)	The Romanesque tower is the oldest part of Vänge Church, built c. 1200. The nave and chancel were most probably built during the second half of the 13th century to replace an earlier stone church. Several reliefs depicting religious and mythological subjects were preserved from this earlier church and immured in the facade of the Gothic church. They have on stylistic grounds been attributed to Byzantios. Thanks to this frieze of reliefs, Vänge Church has been called one of the most unusual Romanesque works of architecture in the Nordic countries.
Väskinde Church	Väskinde; 57°41′26″N 18°25′22″E	(More images)	Construction of the church started in the middle of the 13th century with the Early Gothic chancel. The nave and the tower are somewhat later, from around 1280, and in a High Gothic style. During a renovation in the 1950s picture stones from the 5th and 8th centuries were discovered in the church. Murals from the 13th and 16th centuries were also restored. The baptismal font is by Majestatis, from the mid-12th century, and the church has a rood cross from c. 1240. Both the chancel and the nave have richly decorated portals, the chancel portal is in a style not otherwise found on Gotland. It displays strong influences from art from Westphalia.
Västergarn Church	Västergarn; 57°26′27″N 18°09′03″E	(More images)	Ruins of an earlier, Romanesque church have been discovered at some distance from Västergarn Church. The presently visible church dates from the middle of the 13th century. The entire church is what was supposed to be only the chancel of a much larger, Gothic church, but nothing more than the chancel was built. An arch in the west wall indicates where the opening towards the nave was intended to be. Most of the furnishings of the church are from the 17th century, including a votive ship from 1637. The baptismal font is from 1592.
Västerhejde Church	Västerhejde; 57°34′50″N 18°14′53″E	(More images)	With the exception of the tower, which dates from 1856 and was designed by Fredrik Wilhelm Scholander, Västerhejde Church is a well-preserved Romanesque building from the early 13th century. The altarpiece of the church is attributed to Johan Bartsch and made in 1662. A painting by Fredric Westin depicting the Resurrection and signed 1853 hangs in the chancel. The pulpit is from the 17th century and so is the baptismal font.
Väte Church	Väte; 57°26′56″N 18°21′50″E	(More images)	Foundations of an earlier, 12th-century church have been discovered under the nave. The chancel and the sacristy are the oldest parts of the extant building. They were built in the 14th century. The nave is a work by Egypticus and from the same century. Inside, the church is decorated with murals from the 14th and the 16th centuries. The baptismal font dates from the 12th century and is a work by Byzantios, while the rood cross is from the 13th century. The altarpiece is from 1699, and the pulpit from 1782.
Öja Church	Öja; 57°02′07″N 18°18′0″E	(More images)	The church in Öja is one of the largest on Gotland. The chancel from the 13th century is the oldest part. The nave is from the end of the same century. The tower is from the middle of the 14th century and probably built by the Egypticus workshop. The interior is richly decorated with murals, mostly from the 15th century. The altarpiece is made by Peter Cran in 1643. The rood cross is one of the most elaborate on Gotland, made in the late 13th century.
Östergarn Church	Östergarn; 57°25′18″N 18°51′31″E	(More images)	The whole church was built in the middle of the 13th century. A tower was planned but never built. The church has suffered from fire in 1565 and has twice been pillaged by Russian troops. Most of the furnishings are from the 18th century. There is a memorial in commemoration of the crew of the German cruiser SMS Albatross on the cemetery. Albatross ran aground outside Östergarn after the Battle of Åland Islands in 1915.

== See also ==
- List of churches and chapels on Gotland

== Works cited ==
- Andersson, Aron (1964). Die Glasmalereien des Mittelalters in Skandinavien (Corpus vitrearum Medii Aevi Skandinavien) (in German). Stockholm: Kungl. Vitterhets-, historie- och antikvitetsakademien (Royal Swedish Academy of Letters, History and Antiquities). OCLC 1008233709.
- Andrén, Anders (2017). Det Medeltida Gotland. En arkeologisk guidebok [Medieval Gotland. An archaeological guide book] (in Swedish) (2 ed.). Lund: Historiska Media. ISBN 978-91-7545-476-4.
- Augustsson, Jan-Erik, ed. (1996). Signums svenska konsthistoria. Den gotiska konsten [Signum's history of Swedish art. Gothic art] (in Swedish). Lund: Signum. ISBN 978-91-87896-25-5.
- Jacobsson, Britta; Johansson, Eva; Johansson, Per; Andersson, Rolf (1990). Våra kyrkor [Our churches]. Västervik: Klarkullens förlag AB. ISBN 978-91-971561-0-3.
- Jonsson, Marita; Lindquist, Sven-Olof (1987). Vägen till kulturen på Gotland [The way to culture on Gotland] (in Swedish). Visby: Gotlands fornsal. ISBN 978-91-971048-1-4.
- Karlsson, Lennart, ed. (1995). Signums svenska konsthistoria. Den romanska konsten [Signum's history of Swedish art. Romanesque art] (in Swedish). Lund: Signum. ISBN 978-91-87896-23-1.
- Lagerlöf, Erland; Svahnström, Gunnar (1991). Gotlands kyrkor [Churches of Gotland] (in Swedish) (4th ed.). Stockholm: Rabén & Sjögren. ISBN 978-91-29-61598-2.
- Nord, Anders G.; Tronner, Kate (2014). "Färganalys av fem gotlandskyrkors portaler och muralmålningar" [Analyses of paint from portals and murals in five Medievalchurches on Gotland] (PDF). Fornvännen. Journal of Swedish Antiquarian Research (in Swedish). 109 (2): 118–126. ISSN 0015-7813.
- Nyborg, Ebbe (2009). "Den Sorte Død som afspejlet i skandinavisk arkitektur og kunst" [The Black Death as reflected in Scandinavian Art and Architecture]. Hikuin (in Danish). 36 (36): 45–58. ISSN 2596-7800.
- Qviström, Linda (2019). "Demonen som inte kunde gå runt hörn. Fönster och fönsterlösa norrsidor i kyrkor på Gotland" [The demon who couldn't go around corners. Windows and windowless north walls in churches on Gotland]. In Ljung, Cecilia (ed.). Tidens landskap. En vänbok till Anders Andrén [The landscape of time. Festschrift to Anders Andrén] (in Swedish). Lund: Nordic Academic Press. pp. 189–191. ISBN 978-91-88909-12-1.
- Ranta, Heikki; Hansson, Joakim; Lindroos, Alf; Ringbom, Åsa; Heinemeier, Jan; Brock, Fiona; Hogdins, Greogry (2007). "Om datering av Gotlands medeltida kyrkor" [On the dating of the medieval churches of Gotland]. Hikuin (in Swedish). 36 (36): 85–100. ISSN 2596-7800.
- Roosval, Johnny (1937). "Gotländsk kronologi" [Gotland chronology]. Rig (in Swedish) (4): 187–204. ISSN 0035-5267.
