= Norrlanda Church =

- Norrlanda kyrka
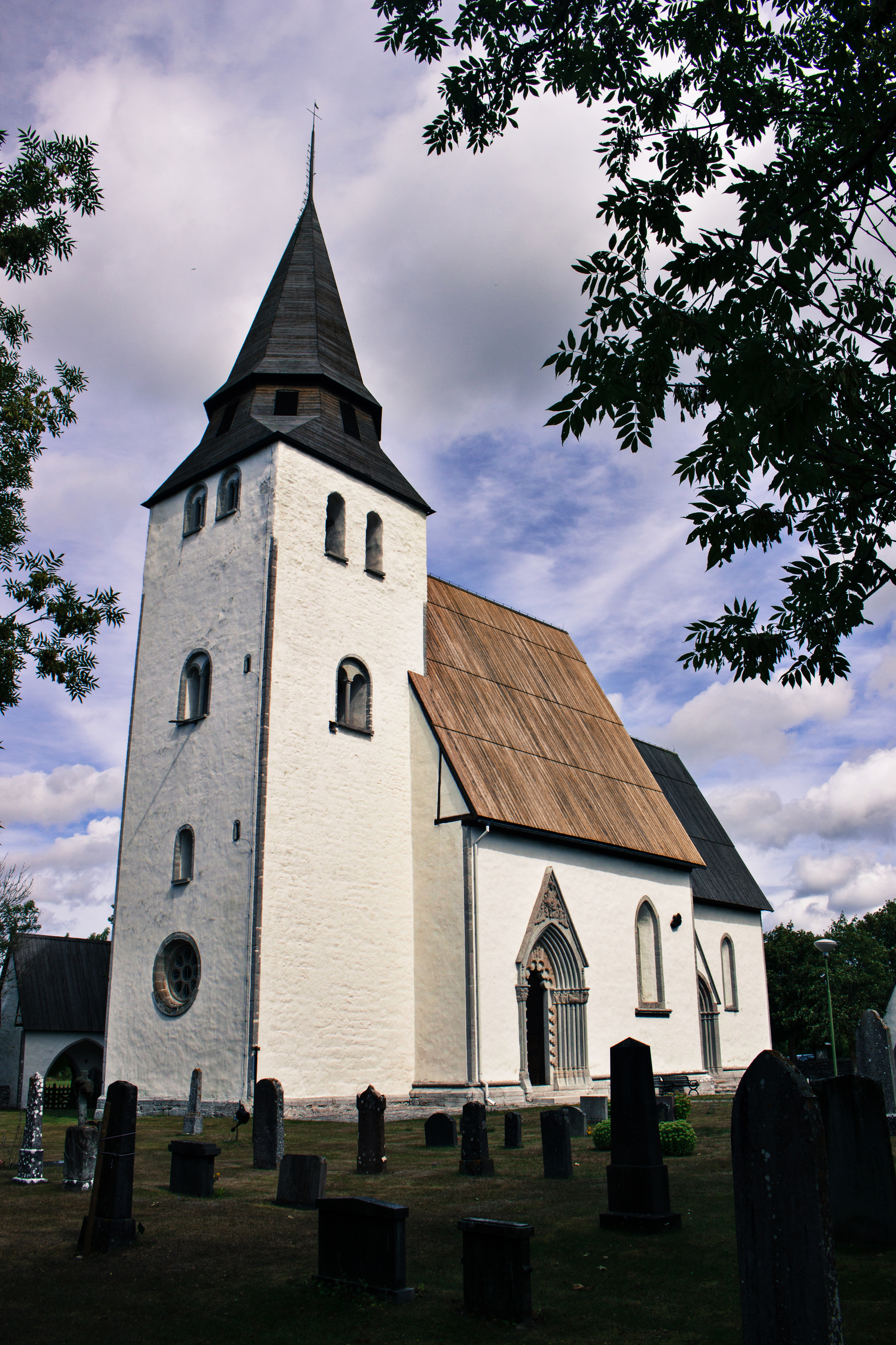
- Norrlanda Church, view of the exterior

- Location on Gotland
- 57°30′05″N 18°39′35″E
- Country: Sweden
- Denomination: Church of Sweden

Norrlanda Church (Swedish: Norrlanda kyrka) is a medieval church on the Swedish island Gotland, in the Diocese of Visby.

== History ==
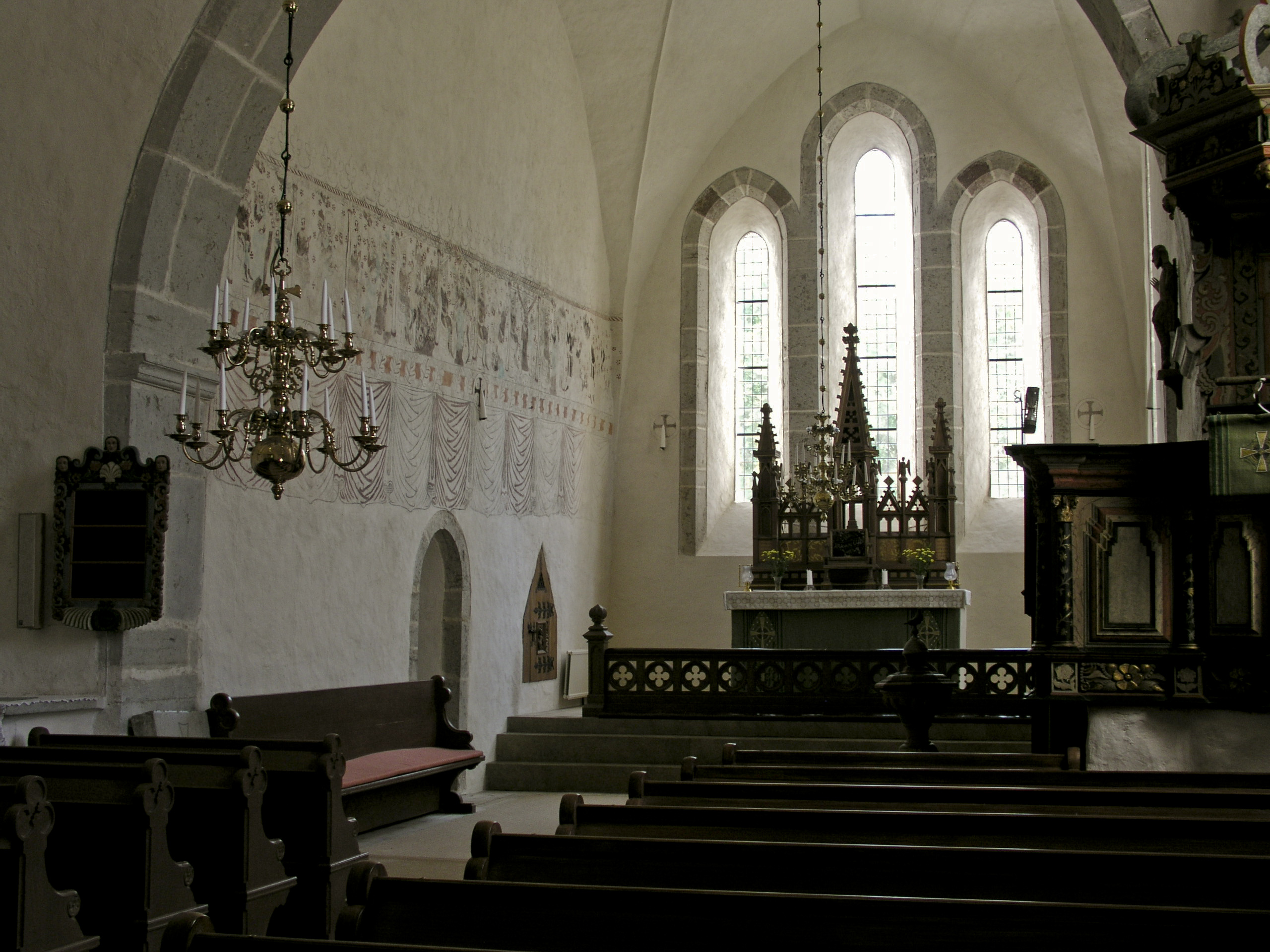
Interior, view towards the choir

A first stone church was built on this site in the 12th century. To this church a Romanesque tower was added in the 13th century. The presently visible church tower is this tower, and the only remains of the first church. The nave and choir were torn down in the late 13th or early 14th century, and replaced with a new choir and sacristy. A new nave was built slightly later, in the middle of the 14th century. These new additions to the church are in Gothic style, as opposed to the older, Romanesque tower. Because of the reconstruction, the tower also seems disproportionately small. Churches with a similar profile can be found elsewhere on Gotland, e.g. in the churches of Ardre and Hablingbo. The church has remained largely unaltered since the Middle Ages. Renovations have been carried out in 1889 and 1953-54.

== Architecture ==
The church is surrounded by a low wall, in which two medieval lychgates survive. In the church exterior, the main portal is noteworthy. It contains some of the most unusual medieval sculpting that can be found among the churches of Gotland. It was made in the 14th century by the stone sculptor or sculptor's workshop which art historians have labelled Egypticus (also active in e.g. Stånga Church). The sculptures depict the Resurrection of Jesus (in the wimperg), and (on the capitals) scenes from the early life of Christ and Mary.

Inside, the church is quite profusely decorated with medieval murals. These seem all to have been made by the so-called Master of the Passion of Christ. They depict scenes from the Passion of Christ, several saints and some scenes depicting devils and women. Among the furnishings of the church, only the base of the baptismal font and the church bell are medieval (12th and 13th centuries). The church bell is supposedly the largest 13th century church bell in Sweden. Other furnishings date mostly from the 18th century and the late 19th century.
