= Vall Church =

- Valls kyrka
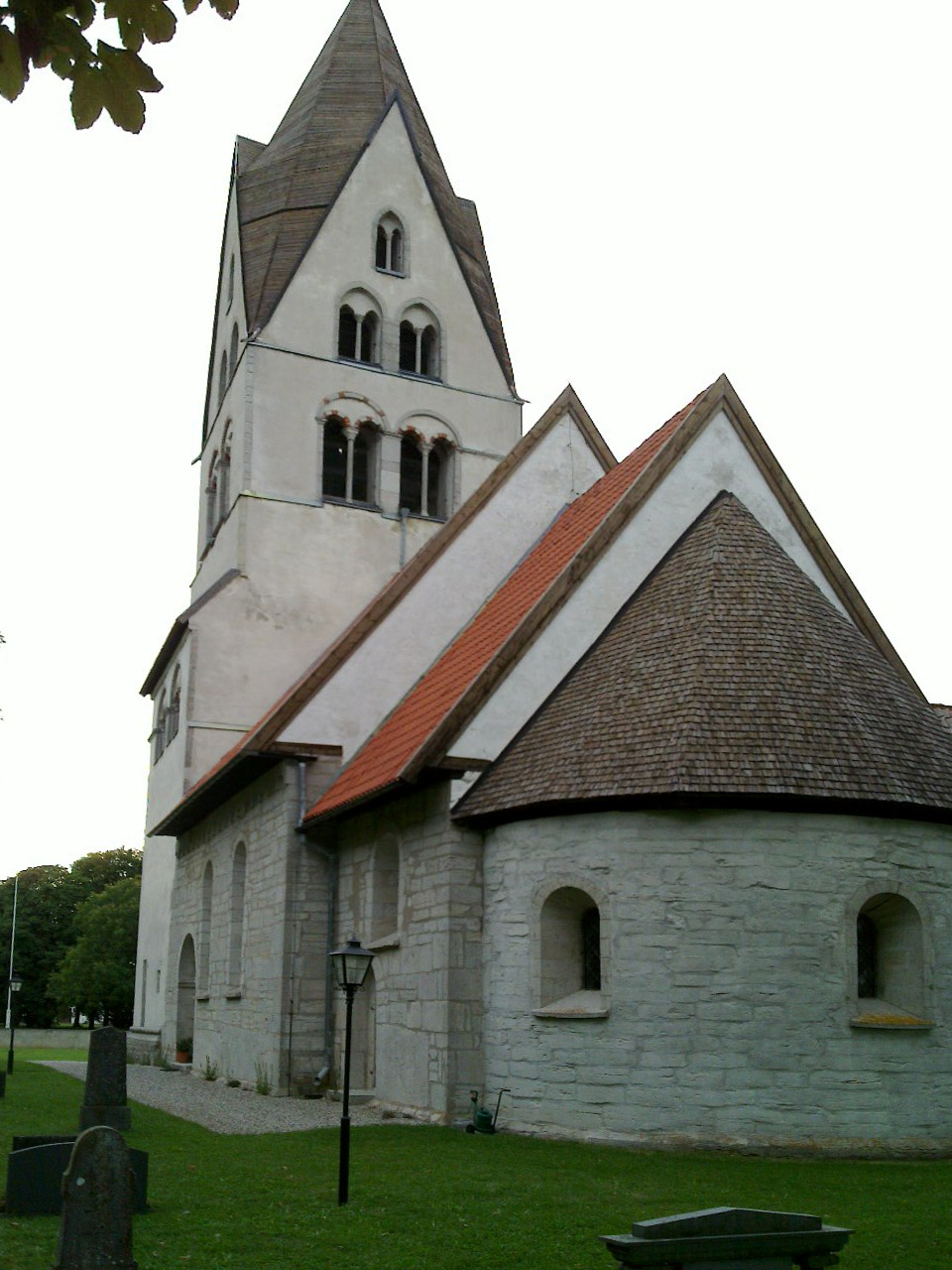
- Vall Church, view of the exterior

- Location on Gotland
- 57°31′15″N 18°20′43″E
- Country: Sweden
- Denomination: Church of Sweden

Administration
- Diocese: Visby

Vall Church (Swedish: Valls kyrka) is a medieval church on the Swedish island of Gotland. The largely Romanesque church dates from the 13th century. It belongs to the Diocese of Visby.

== History and architecture ==
Vall Church is a largely Romanesque church that dates from the 13th century. It was built in three phases. Oldest is the choir with the apse, and the nave, dating from the early part of the century. The tower was begun during the middle of the century and made higher at the end of the century.

The church is a relatively well-preserved Romanesque building, with a tower that is unusually tall in comparison with similar churches on Gotland. All the church portals are Romanesque, and of these the north portal of the tower is the most noteworthy. Inside, the vaults of the nave are supported by a single central pillar, whose decoration is reminiscent of the decoration in the choir of Visby Cathedral. In the tower base there is a separate chamber with a hagioscope opening towards the nave. Similar chambers can be found e.g. in Bro and Martebo churches. Remains of medieval stained glass panes exist in one of the church windows. In the south wall of the apse sits a niche with a pair of doors from circa 1300. The doors are richly carved and carry runic inscriptions. The altarpiece is from 1684, and made in Burgsvik, while the baptismal font dates from the 12th century and is a work by the Romanesque artist Majestatis. The pulpit is a work from the early 18th century. In the church floor there is also the tombstone of Peter Harding, who led the peasant faction during a civil war on Gotland in 1288. The oldest of the church bells, finally, dates from 1443 and had belonged to Hogrän Church.
