= Näs Church, Gotland =

Näs Church
- Näs kyrka
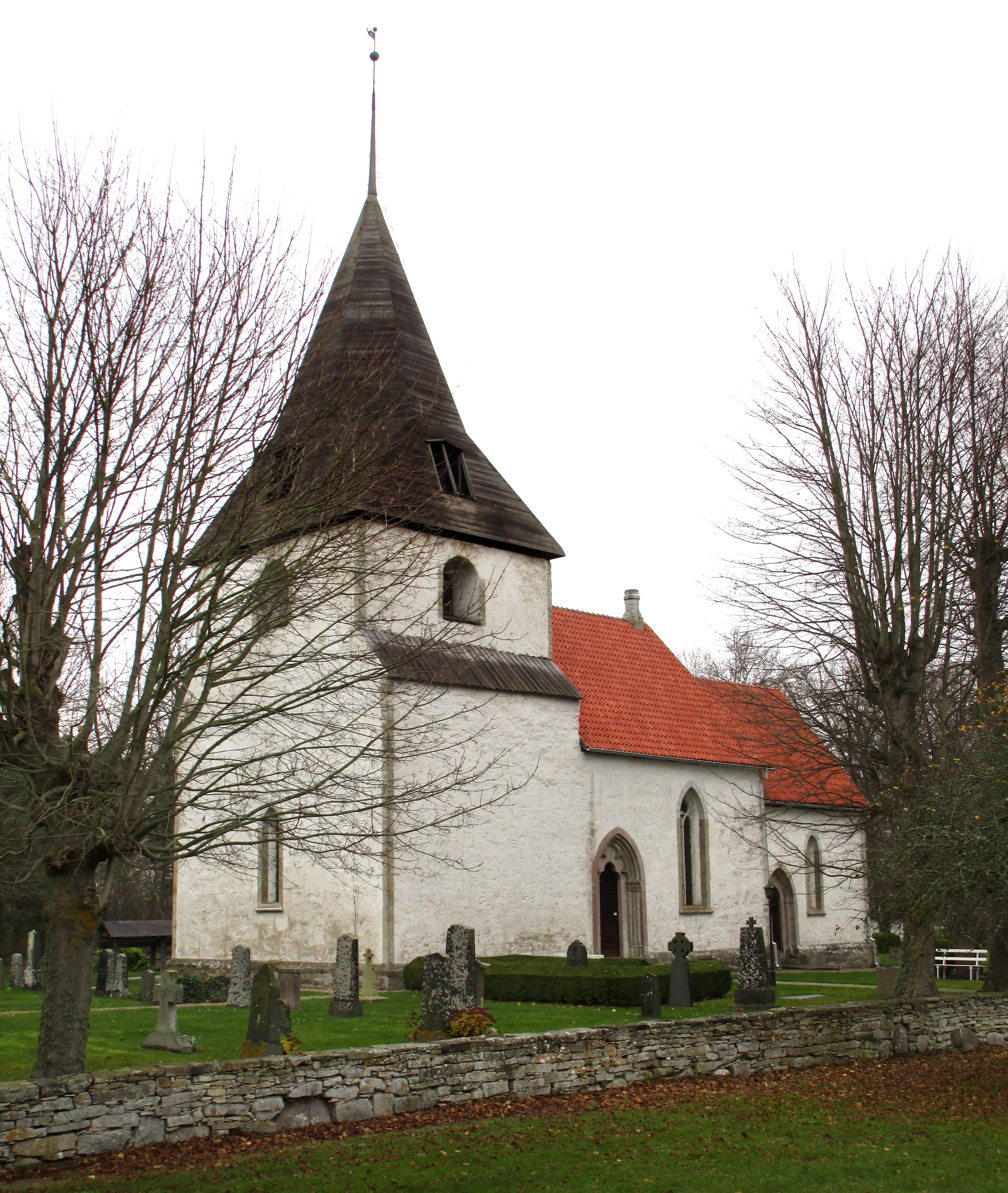
- Näs Church, view of the exterior

- Location on Gotland
- 57°06′37″N 18°15′44″E
- Country: Sweden
- Denomination: Church of Sweden

Administration
- Diocese: Visby

Näs Church (Swedish: Näs kyrka) is a medieval church on the Swedish island of Gotland. It was built in the 13th century, and has hardly been altered since. It belongs to the Diocese of Visby.

== History and architecture ==
The church was built in the middle of the 13th century, and remains today largely unchanged. The interior was changed during a renovation made in 1910, and according to tradition the tower was originally higher (however, nothing seems to indicate that this is true). However, few of the original furnishings have survived. The altarpiece dates from 1692, and made in Burgsvik, while the pulpit is from the middle of the 18th century. The triumphal cross is a copy of a medieval crucifix, but a few fragments of an original triumphal cross survive in the Gotland Museum in Visby. In the sacristy, fragments of a medieval tombstone are also stored; the fragmentary picture on the tombstone may possible depict a bishop.
