= Sproge Church =

- Sproge kyrka
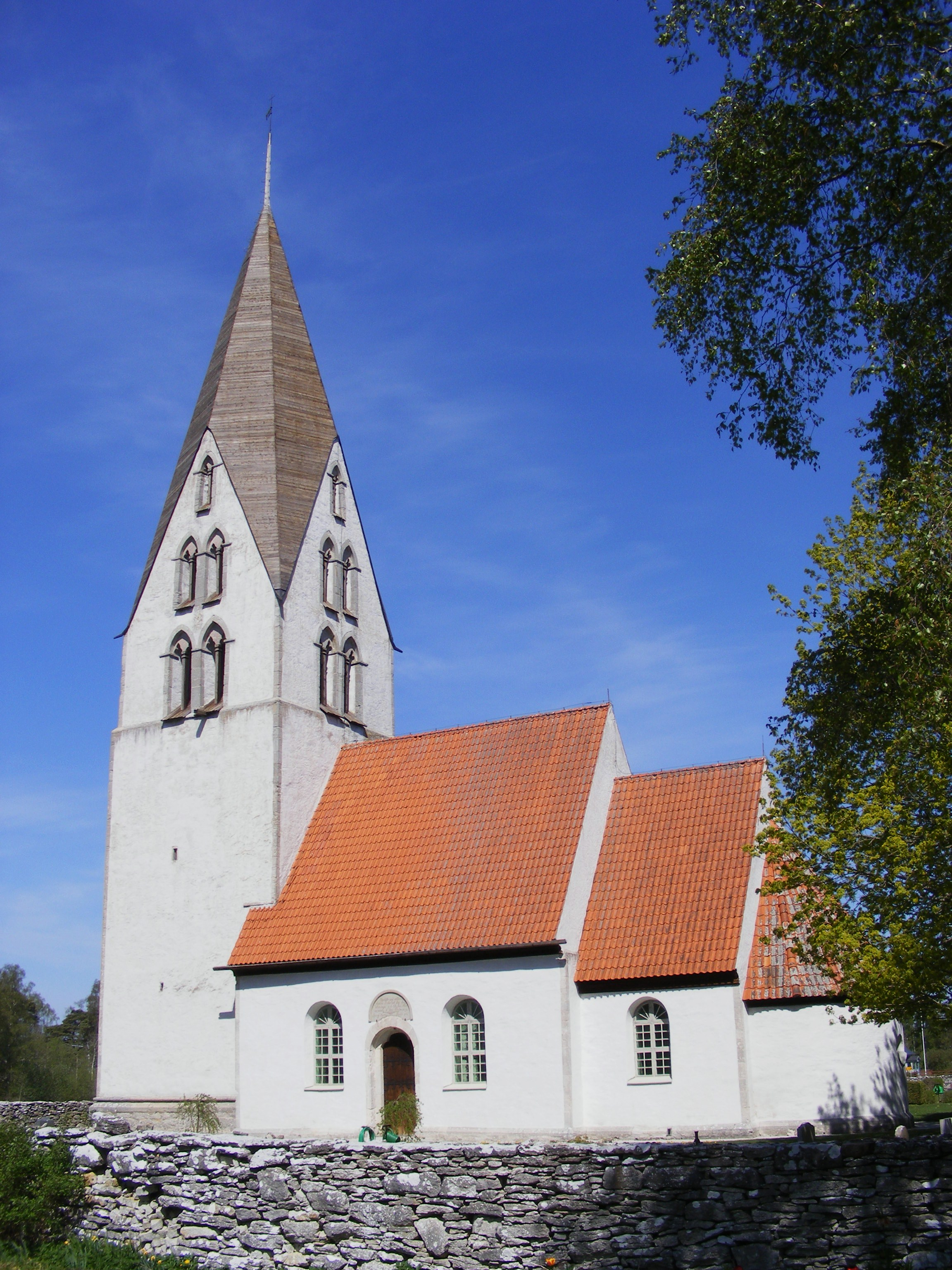
- Sproge Church, view of the exterior

- Location within Gotland
- 57°15′13″N 18°12′39″E
- Country: Sweden
- Denomination: Church of Sweden

Administration
- Diocese: Visby

Sproge Church (Swedish: Sproge kyrka) is a medieval church on the Swedish island of Gotland. Built during the 13th century, it was heavily restored in 1839-1840. It lies in the Diocese of Visby.

== History and architecture ==
The presently visible stone church at Sproge dates from the 13th century. The nave and choir are the oldest parts of the church, built during the first half of the century. The tower was added at the end of the same century. On the south facade of the church there is a plaque claiming the construction date of the church to be 1058, but this date appears to be pure fantasy. The church however had a wooden predecessor, a stave church built on the same site. Some 40 planks from this church are preserved in the Gotland Museum in Visby. The wooden church was probably built during the 11th century.

The church was thoroughly reconstructed in 1839-40, when new windows were inserted in the wall, the interior medieval vaulting replaced by a modern ceiling and a new southern entrance constructed. Of the medieval inventories, only the 14th-century triumphal cross remains. The altarpiece and baptismal font both date from the 17th century. In the choir floor there also remain three medieval tombstones, and in the ground floor of the tower sits a pre-Christian picture stone with runic inscriptions. The picture stone tells the story of two men named Gairvatr and Audvatr who made a dolmen for their mother, and displays a picture showing the dead woman riding a sleigh towards the realm of the dead. Opposite this, a more modern memorial plaque has been put up, commemorating a British pilot who died when crashing with his plane in the Baltic Sea close to the church during World War II.

The church was renovated in 1965.
