= Vallstena Church =

- Vallstena kyrka
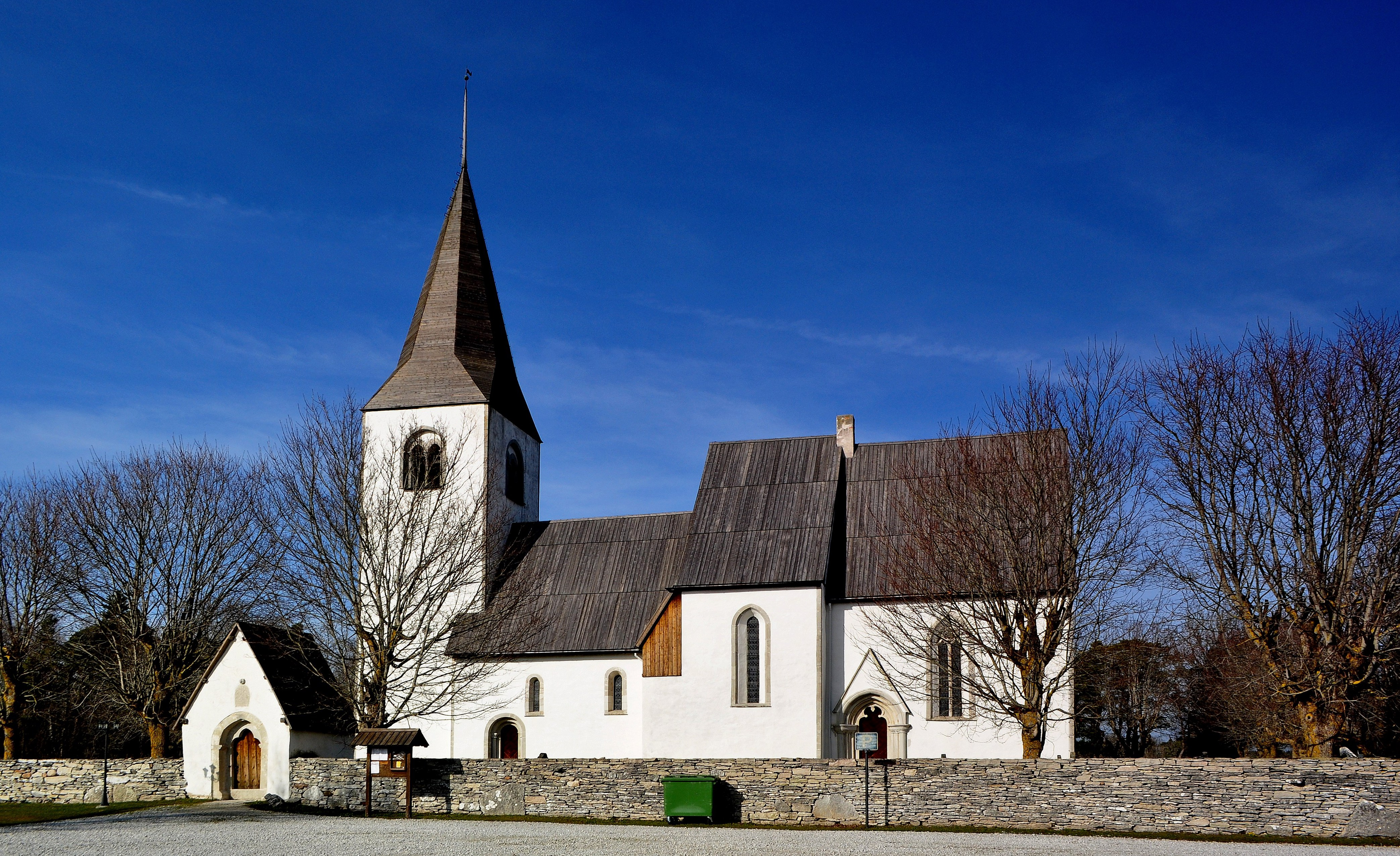
- Vallstena Church, view of the exterior

- Location within Gotland
- 57°36′35″N 18°38′12″E
- Country: Sweden
- Denomination: Church of Sweden

Administration
- Diocese: Visby

Vallstena Church (Swedish: Vallstena kyrka) is a medieval church on the island of Gotland, Sweden. It belongs to the Diocese of Visby.

== History and architecture ==
The western part of the nave and the church tower are the oldest parts of the asymmetrical church; they date from the early 13th century. A new chancel arch was built at the middle of the same century, and around circa 1300 the new choir was built. Reconstruction of the nave also started around this time; the original plan seems to have been to replace the entire nave with a new, larger nave but for some reason the work came to a halt. Similar, half-rebuilt churches are relatively common on Gotland. The sacristy was also built at this time. The interior of the church was decorated with medieval murals in the 15th century. The western, older part of the church is Romanesque in style; the eastern Gothic.

The church and its cemetery is surrounded by a low wall, with three lychgates. The oldest of these dates from the 13th century and display some original sculptured details.

== Fittings ==
The baptismal font is the oldest fitting of the church, dating from the middle of the 13th century. The altarpiece dates from the 14th century and was acquired when the new choir was inaugurated. From the same century dates a crucifix, as well as a richly decorated chest for donations for the poor. From the 14th century are also to tombstones on either side of the altar, carrying inscriptions in both Latin and Old Gutnish; the latter in runes. A few 14th century wooden statues depicting saints originally from Vallstena Church are today housed in Gotland Museum in Visby.
