= Silte Church =

- Silte kyrka
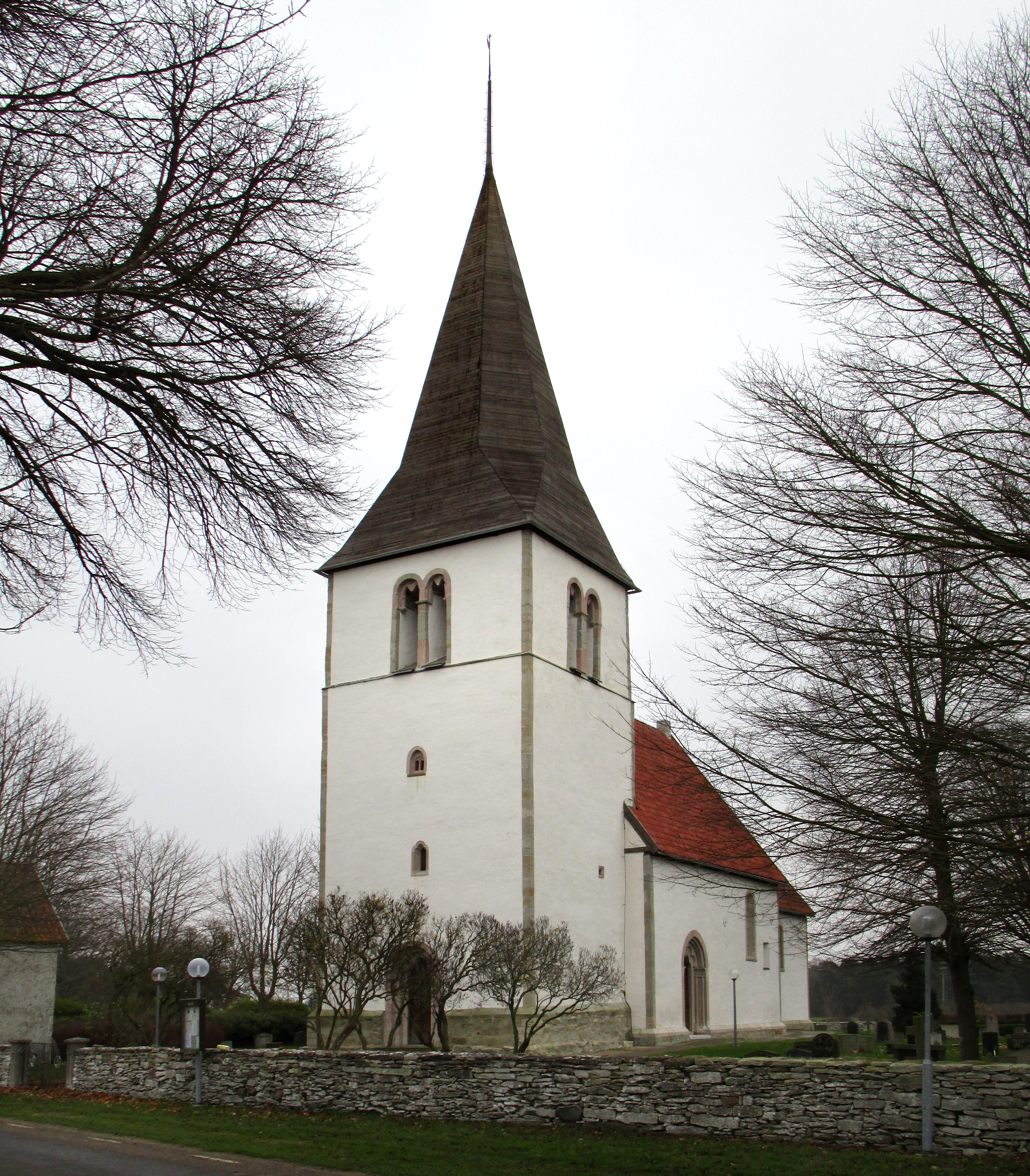
- Silte Church, view of the exterior

- Location on Gotland
- 57°13′16″N 18°14′12″E
- Country: Sweden
- Denomination: Church of Sweden

Administration
- Diocese: Visby

Silte Church (Swedish: Silte kyrka) is an almost unaltered medieval church on the Swedish island of Gotland. Silte Church was built during the 13th century and contains a number of medieval fittings as well as murals. It belongs to the Church of Sweden and lies in the Diocese of Visby.

== History ==
Silte Church dates in its entirety from the 13th century. During restorative work carried out in 1971–72, the remains of a stave church was however found under the floor of the presently visible church, pre-dating the present church with around one hundred years. The oldest part of the now visible stone church is the choir, dating from the middle of the century and in an early Gothic style. The nave is only slightly later, and apparently by the same workshop, while the tower seems to have been added at the end of the century.

== Architecture ==
The church is an almost unaltered medieval church. Unusually, even the window openings are original. These, as well as the portals, are decorated with stone dressings in alternating colours. The southern portal is also decorated with carved ornaments in Norse style. One of the choir windows contains some original stained glass window panes, dating from the time of the church's construction. Inside, the church is decorated with medieval murals from four different periods. The earliest date from the time of the church's construction, and are purely ornamental. On the western wall of the nave, a number of paintings from circa 1300 depict several saints: Philip, Paul, Peter, James and Bartholomew. Next to these is a mural depicting scenes from the Passion of Christ; these date from the middle of the 15th century. A final set of murals, dated 1495, adorn the southern wall of the nave.

The church has two particularly noteworthy furnishings: the altarpiece and the baptismal font. The altarpiece is unique in its style on Gotland. Its outer wings are painted, and depict St. Michael, Mary and, on the back, the annunciation. These painting date from circa 1500. The central panel, by contrast, is decorated with wooden sculptures depicting the final judgement, and date from the 13th century. The baptismal font dates from the late 12th century and is thus older than the stone church. It was made by Master Sigraf, and is richly sculptured. Most other furnishings such as pews date from 1902, when a renovation was carried out. The pulpit is however from the middle of the 18th century.
