= Ardre Church =

- Ardre kyrka
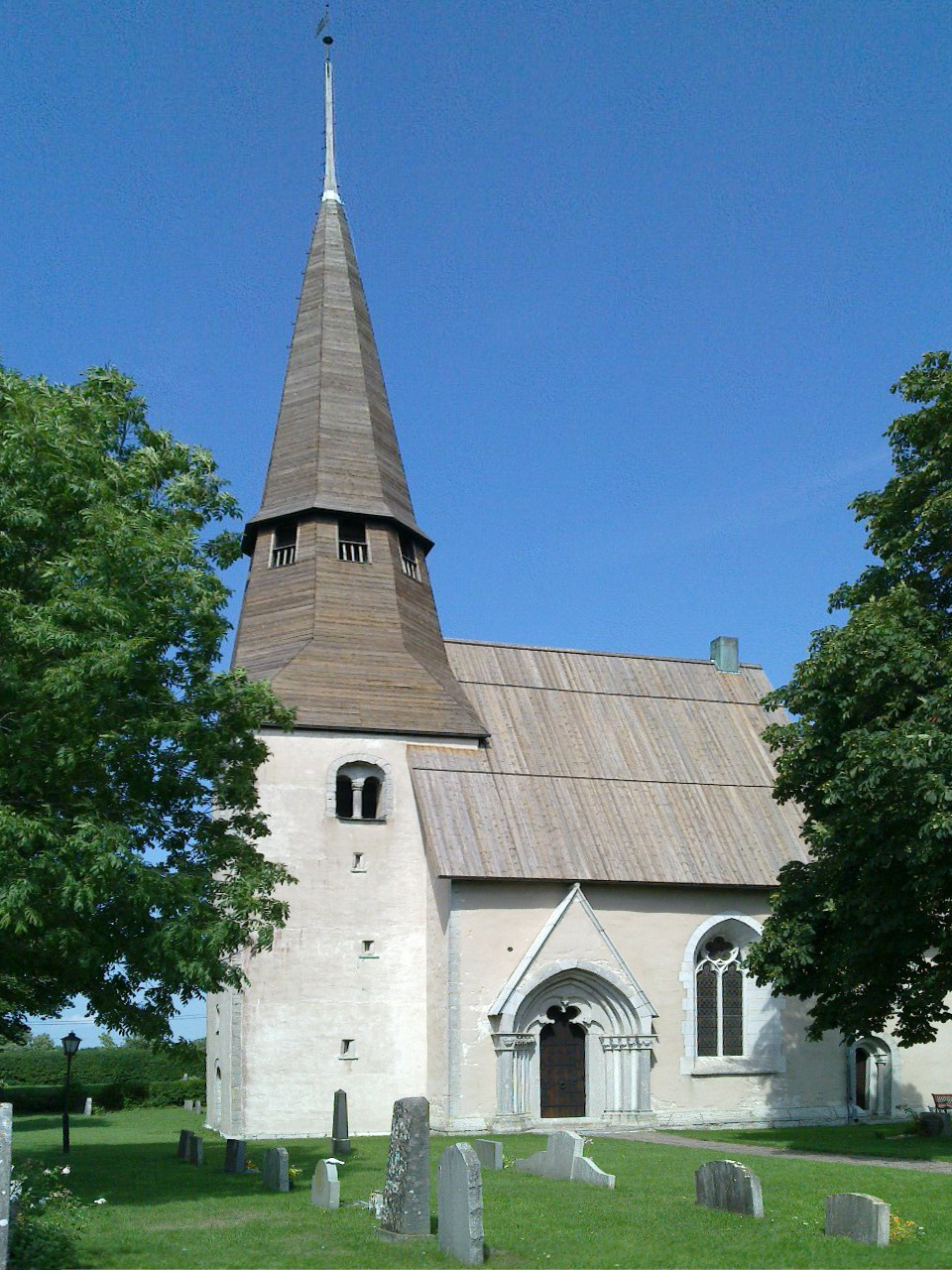
- Ardre Church, view of the exterior

- Location on Gotland
- 57°22′46″N 18°41′49″E
- Country: Sweden
- Denomination: Church of Sweden
- Previous denomination: Catholic

Administration
- Diocese: Visby

Ardre Church (Swedish: Ardre kyrka) is a medieval church in Ardre on the Swedish island of Gotland. It was built during the 13th century, but the interior re-decorated in 1900–1902 after plans by artist Axel Haig. Several of the furnishings of the church are medieval. The church is in the Diocese of Visby of the Church of Sweden.

== History and architecture ==
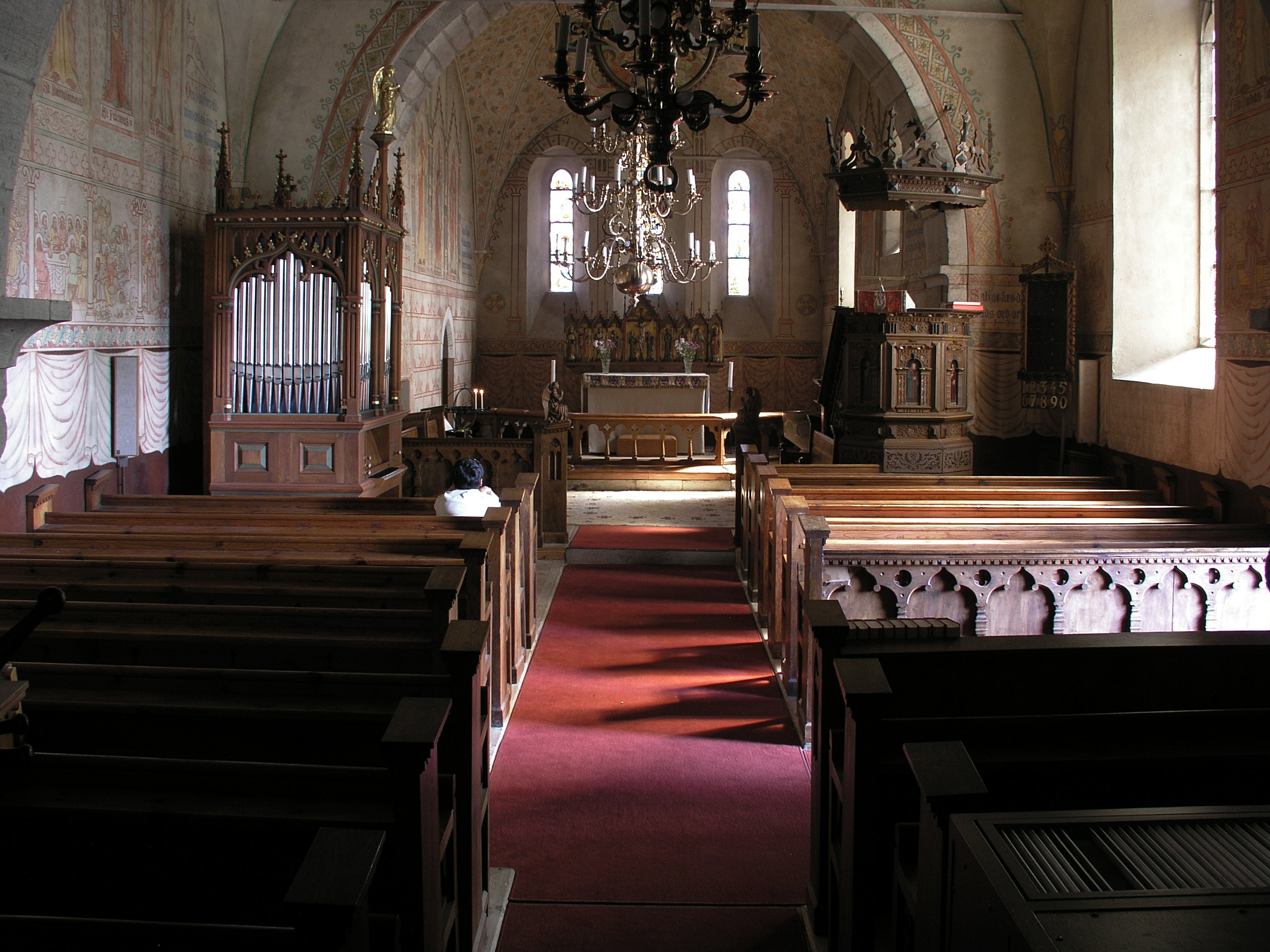
View towards the choir

The oldest part of the church is the tower, dating from about 1200. The tower originally belonged to an earlier church building from the 12th century, the nave and choir of which was replaced with the current building circa 1250. The sculptured choir portal originally also belonged to the earlier church.

The interior of the church was heavily remodelled in a Neo-Medieval style between 1900–1902 after plans by architect and artist Axel Haig (known in Swedish as Axel Hermann Hägg, 1835–1921). The dominant wall paintings are consequently designed by Haig. A few stained glass windows remain but were complemented by modern replicas during the renovation.

The furnishings of the church are still largely medieval: an altarpiece from the early 14th century, a triumphal cross and baptismal font, both from the middle of the 13th century, and a carved wooden Madonna from circa 1500 are all in their original milieu. The organ is an elaborate Gothic Revival piece, made for the renovation in 1902 and inspired by medieval French organs.

Ardre church belongs to the Church of Sweden and lies within the Diocese of Visby.
