= Hablingbo Church =

- Hablingbo kyrka
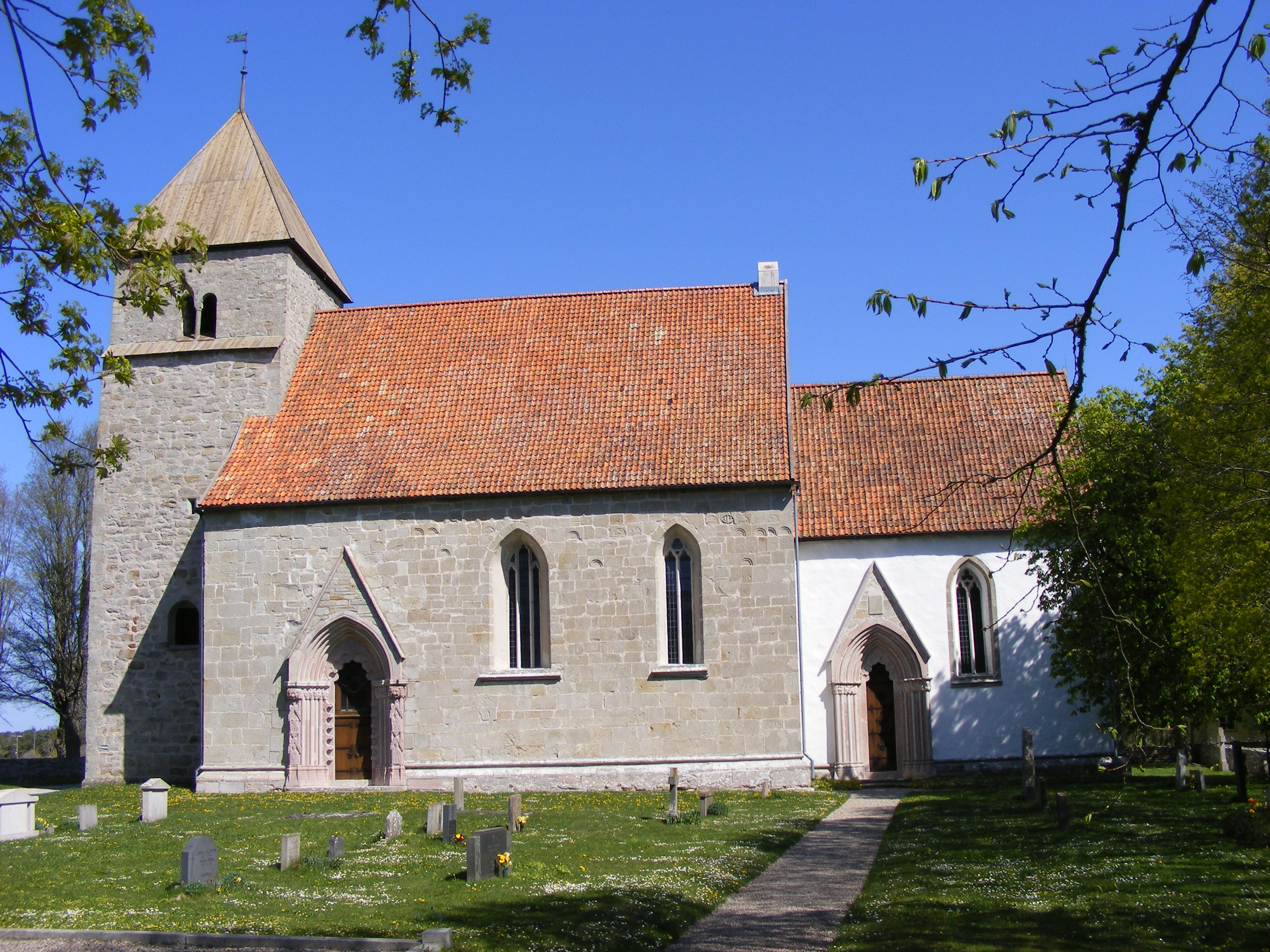
- Hablingbo Church, view of the exterior

- Location on Gotland
- 57°11′14″N 18°15′46″E
- Country: Sweden
- Denomination: Church of Sweden

Administration
- Diocese: Visby

Hablingbo Church (Swedish: Hablingbo kyrka) is a medieval church in Hablingbo on the Swedish island of Gotland. It is one of the largest churches on Gotland, and dating largely from the 14th century, although the current church building was preceded by a stave church. The stone portals of the church are comparatively richly decorated. It is used by the Church of Sweden and part of the Diocese of Visby.

== History ==
The earliest church at the site was a stave church, built in the early 12th century at the latest. It was later replaced by a Romanesque stone church, the tower of which still survives in the present building. The nave and choir were completely rebuilt during the 14th century to their present Gothic look. Few alterations have been made since. Several of the medieval furnishings have been removed and placed in museums, however. The altarpiece is Baroque in style and dates from the 1600s, and the pews are neo-Gothic, dating from the 1890s.

== Architecture ==
The church is one of the largest on Gotland. The nave has broad bays and high vaults and is unusually monumental. Typically for churches on the island, the choir lacks an apse.

The church has three richly carved portals set in the facade. The oldest is on the northern side and is probably a remnant of the older, Romanesque church. The sculpted decor dates from the 12th century and is a work by the anonymous artist Majestatis. It includes, among other things, one of the first known depictions of the Devil in Scandinavian art. The sculpted portal is considered one of the most interesting pieces of Romanesque art in present-day Sweden. The other portals are located on the south facade, and are later, Gothic pieces of sculpture. Especially the main portal displays a rich décor. The sculptures depict Christian themes, such as the life of Mary. The portals were probably made in the medieval workshop which is sometimes referred to as Egypticus.

Inside, there are remains of wall paintings from the 15th century in the choir. On a wall in the tower, there is also a painted Troy Town; here is also a gravestone located which probably predates the stone church. It is a Christian gravestone, carved with runes.

== Portals of Hablingbo church ==
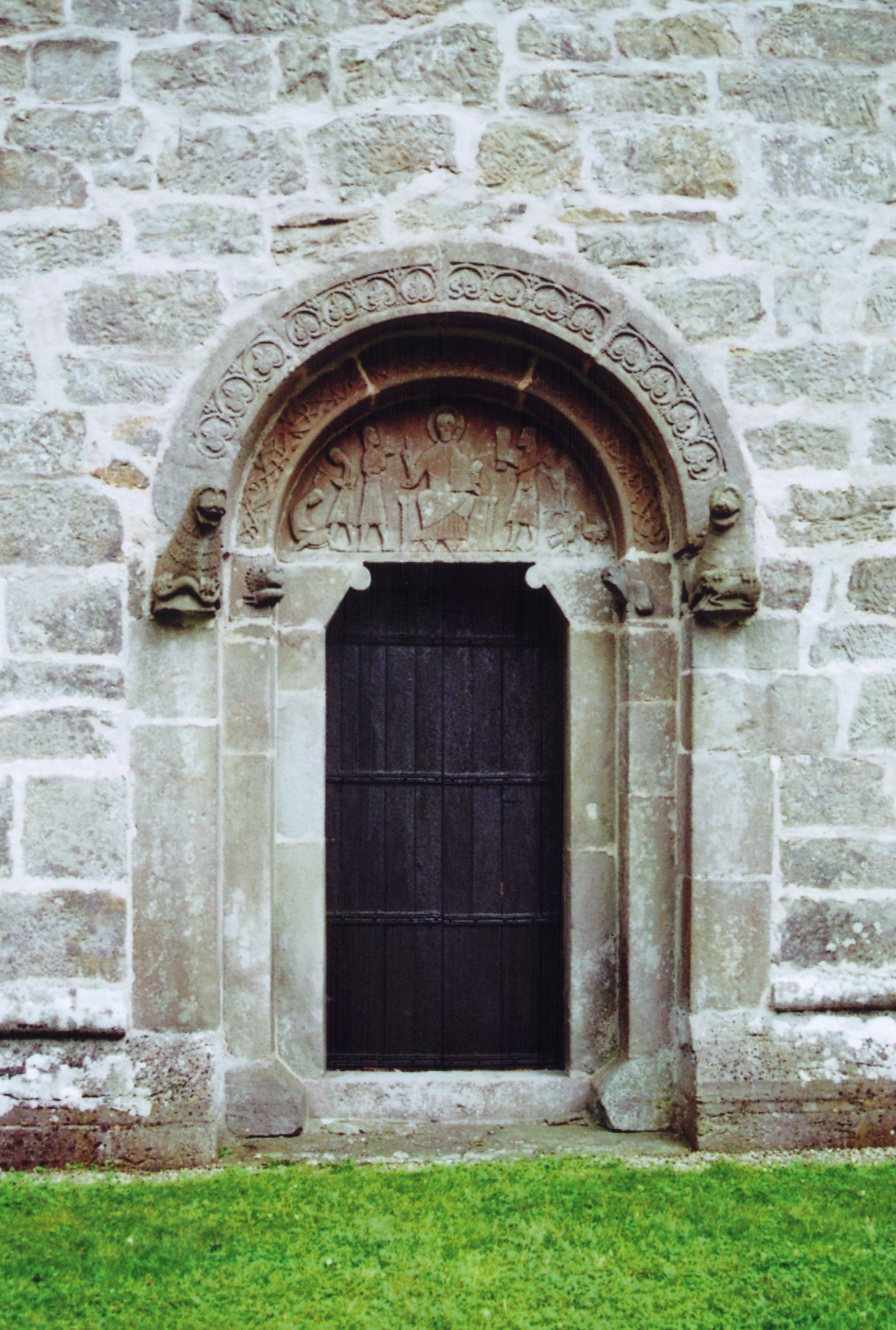
The north (Romanesque) portal

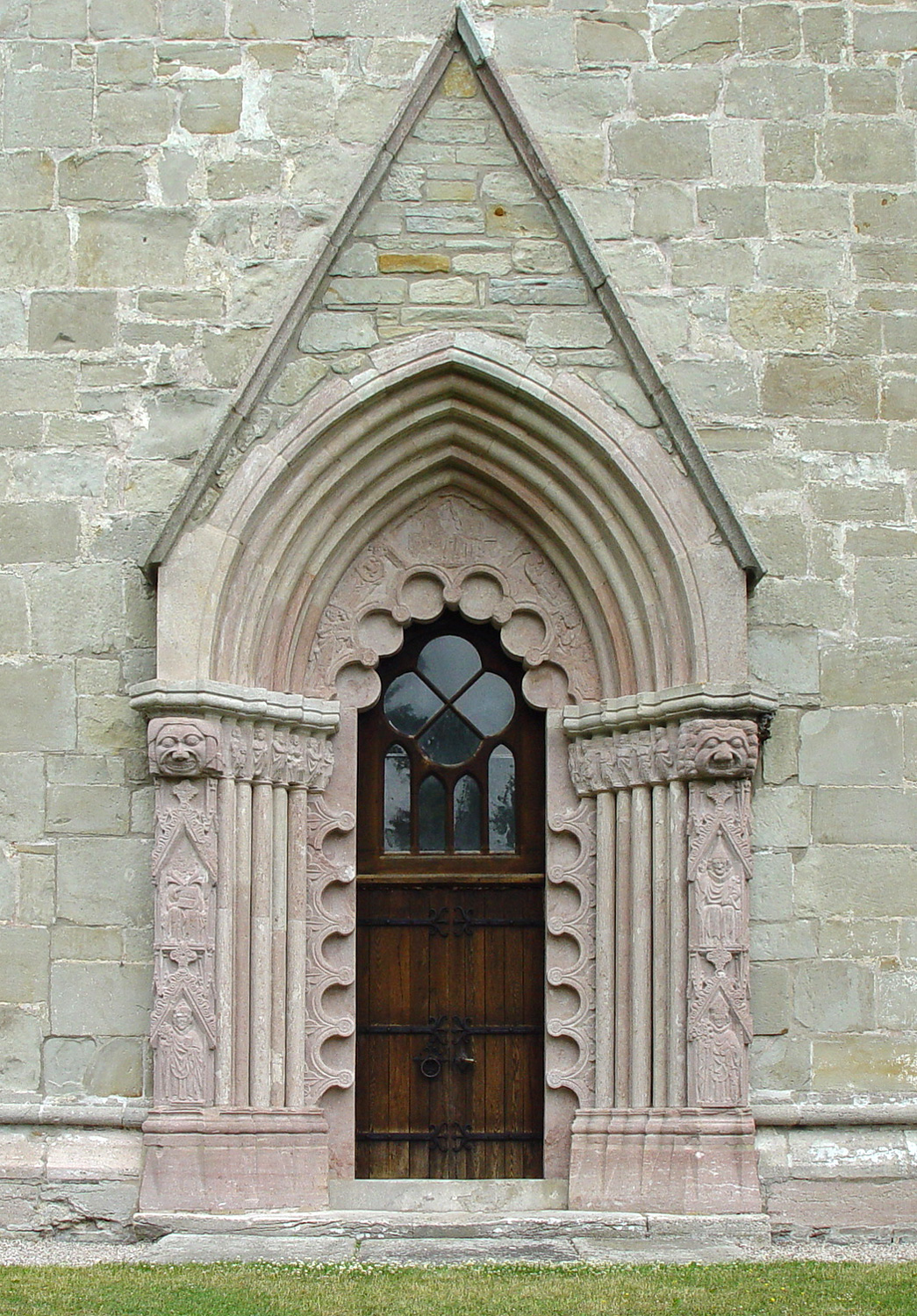
The main southern (Gothic) portal

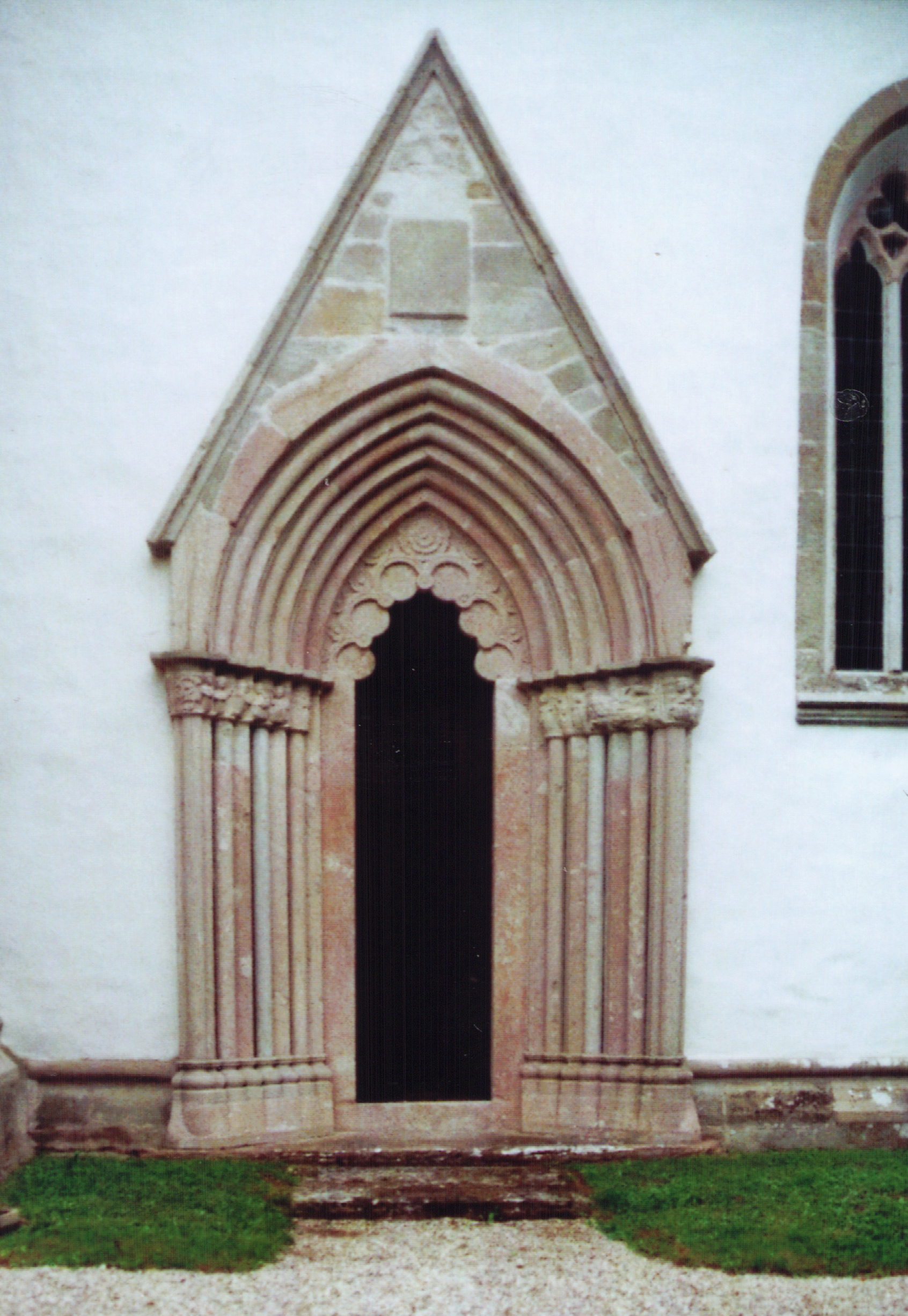
The southern, choir (Gothic) portal
