= Martebo Church =

- Martebo kyrka
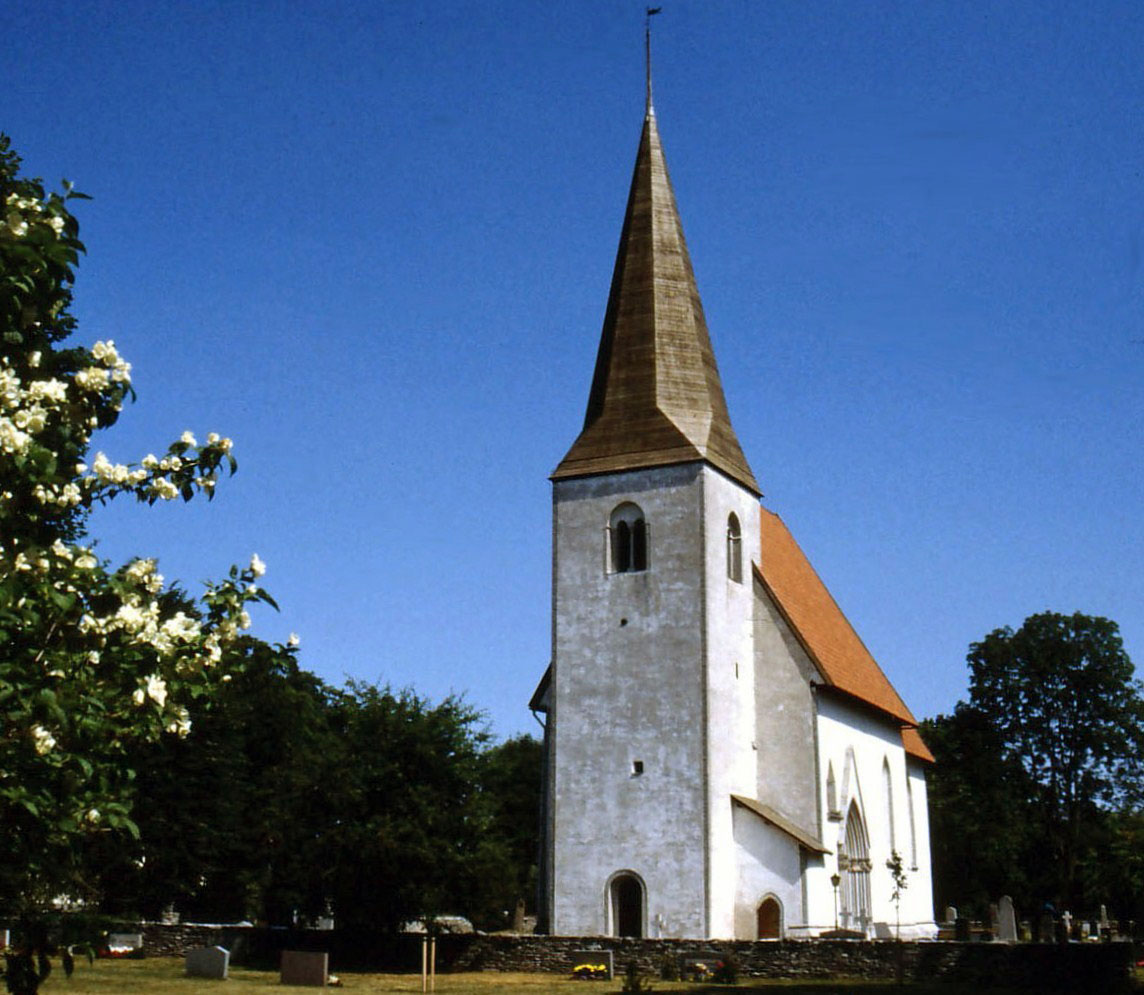
- Martebo Church, view of the exterior

- Location on Gotland
- 57°44′54″N 18°29′40″E
- Country: Sweden
- Denomination: Church of Sweden

Administration
- Diocese: Visby

Martebo Church (Swedish: Martebo kyrka) is a medieval church on the Swedish island of Gotland. Its three portals contain some of the richest medieval sculpture on the island. Martebo Church lies in the Diocese of Visby.

== History ==
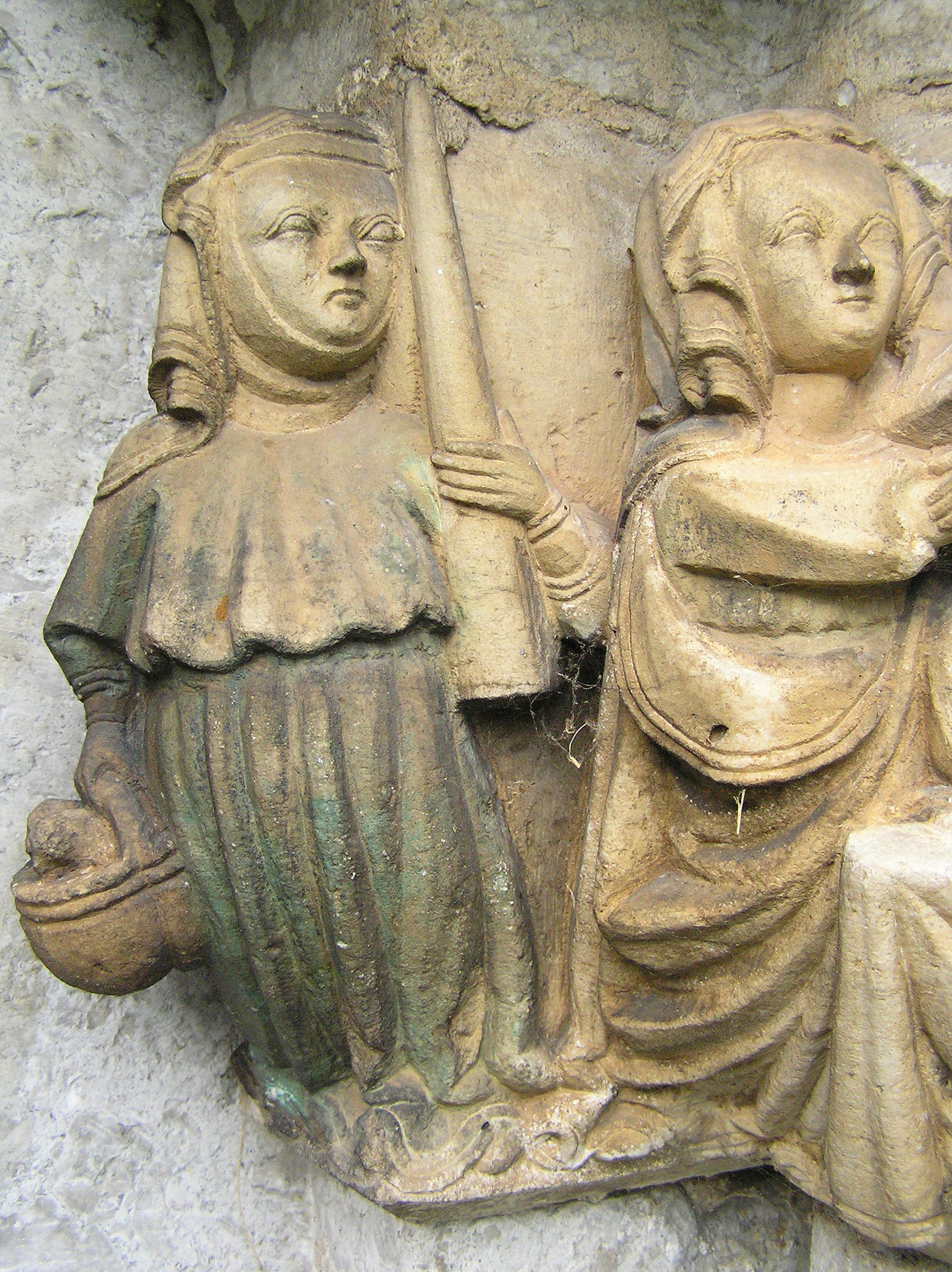
Detail of one of the sculpted portals of Martebo church, with remains of original paint

Little is known about the origins and oldest history of the church. The stone church may have been pre-dated by a stave church. Of the presently visible church, the tower is the oldest part, dating from the middle of the 13th century and Romanesque in style. The Gothic nave and choir are from the early 14th century and replaced and earlier and smaller Romanesque building.

== Architecture ==
The church is of a type which is rather characteristic for Gotland, in which the nave and choir were rebuilt during the High Gothic, but where the older tower remains, resulting in an unproportionally short tower in relation to the rest of the building. Adjacent to the tower there is a rather unusual detail, a small chamber which has a window onto the nave but lacks any other connection. It probably functioned as a hagioscope (perhaps for sick members of the congregation) and which was added during the 14th century.

The external façade of the church, notably the three portals, display some of the most accomplished medieval sculpture on Gotland. They date from the 14th century and were made when the church was rebuilt in Gothic style. On some of the sculptures traces of the original paint still survive. The sculptures were probably executed by the local stonemason's workshop which is sometimes referred to by the notname Egypticus. They depict the life of Jesus as told in the New Testament, with scenes following each other chronologically and from one portal to the other, so that the three portals together make out an entire sculpted narrative.

Inside the church are the remains of medieval murals and a baptismal font from the 13th century. Two medieval tombstones are placed in the floor of the choir. The pulpit is one of the oldest on Gotland, dating from middle of the 16th century.
