= Burgsvik =

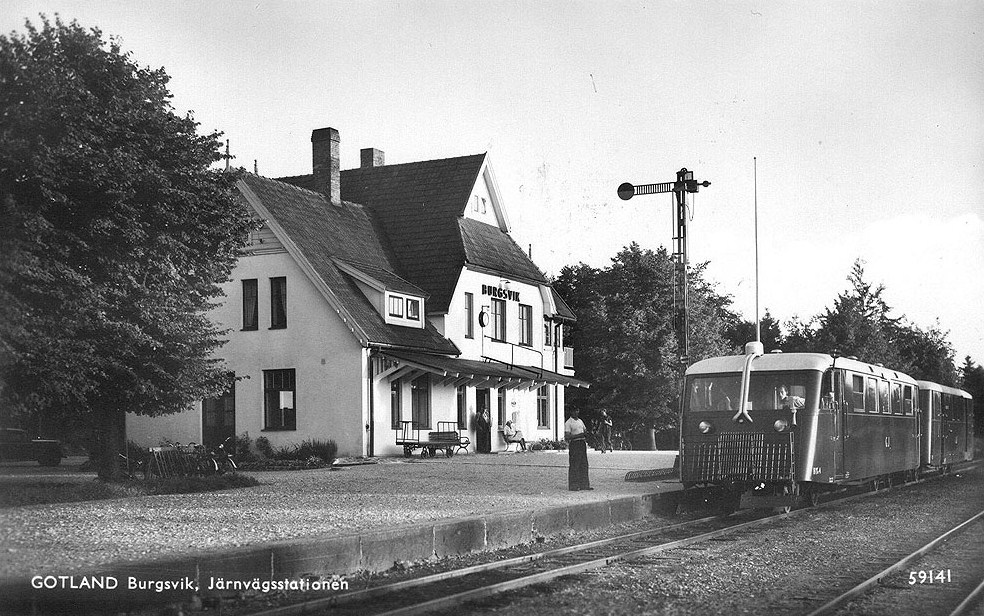
- Burgviks station

- Location within Gotland
- Coordinates: 57°01′52″N 18°16′24″E
- Country: Sweden
- Province: Gotland
- County: Gotland County
- Municipality: Gotland Municipality

Area
  - Total: 0.94 km^{2} (0.36 sq mi)

Population (31 December 2014)
  - Total: 350
- Time zone: UTC+1 (CET)
  - Summer (DST): UTC+2 (CEST)

Burgsvik /bɵ̌ʂvɪk/ is a locality situated in Öja in the Swedish island of Gotland with 350 inhabitants in 2014. Burgsvik lies in the southern part of the island of Gotland. The Burgsvik beds are a geological sequence found there.
