= GHJ =

GHJ, GĦJ, or ghj may refer to:

- Gotlands Hesselby Jernväg (Gotland Hesselby Railway), narrow gauge museum railway in Gotland, Sweden
- GĦJ, abbreviation for Għajnsielem F.C., Maltese football club
- GHJ, station code for Gursahaiganj railway station, a stop on the Kalindi Express, India
- ⟨ghj⟩, a Latin-script trigraph
