= Roma, Gotland =

Roma Romakloster
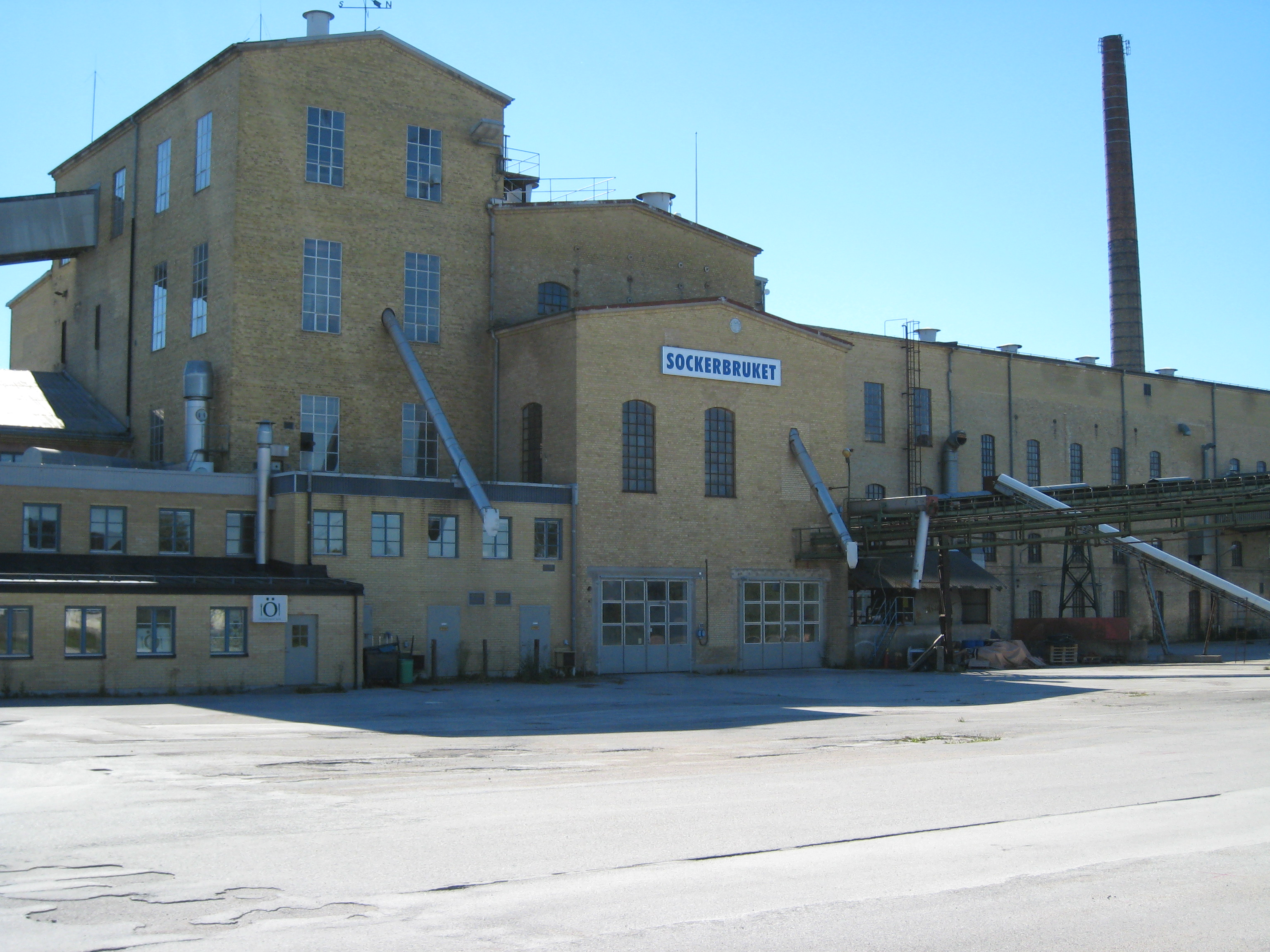
- The old sugar refinery in Roma

- Location of Romakloster on Gotland
- Coordinates: 57°30′19.7″N 18°27′14.6″E
- Country: Sweden
- Province: Gotland
- County: Gotland County
- Municipality: Gotland Municipality

Area
  - Total: 1.26 km^{2} (0.49 sq mi)

Population (31 December 2014)
  - Total: 936
- Time zone: UTC+1 (CET)
  - Summer (DST): UTC+2 (CEST)

Roma (Swedish pronunciation: [ˈrûːma]), also by proxy referred to as Romakloster, is a locality on the Swedish island of Gotland, with 936 inhabitants in 2014.

Roma is also the name of the larger populated area, socken (not to be confused with parish). It comprises the same area as the administrative Roma District, established on 1 January 2016.

Roma Abbey, a ruined medieval monastery and crown estate manor, lies in Roma.

== Geography ==
Roma is the name of the main locality in the socken. It is also the name of the socken as well as the district. Roma is situated in the central part of Gotland. The medieval Roma Church, is situated in the smaller locality Lövsta, sometimes referred to as Roma kyrkby, in Roma socken.

As of 2019, Roma Church belongs to Roma parish in Romaklosters pastorat.

== History ==
In 1995 the locality known as Roma was divided by Statistics Sweden into a part with the tentative name of "Roma kyrkby" or "Lövsta" (pop. 277) and the remaining part that retained the name "Roma" (pop. 913), but is using "Romakloster" as the postal address. Some confusion is caused by the fact that Lövsta/Roma kyrkby has been referred to as "Roma" in the statistical figures since 2000. (Note: Cf. the population figures from 1995 for Roma kyrkby/Roma (277 people) and Romakloster (902) given in Tätorter 1995, p. 30, and Tätorter 2000, p. 27.)

== Railways ==
Roma got a railway connection to Visby in 1878 and was from 1902 the island's main railway hub as a junction for its two main railways Both lines used the Swedish three-foot narrow gauge (891 mm). The railways were closed in 1953 and 1960 respectively. In 2015, however, the heritage railway Gotlands Hesselby Jernväg was extended to Roma, which thus regained access to rail traffic. The railway is maintained by the Gotland Train Association.

== See also ==
- List of church ruins on Gotland
