= Ekeby, Gotland =

Ekeby
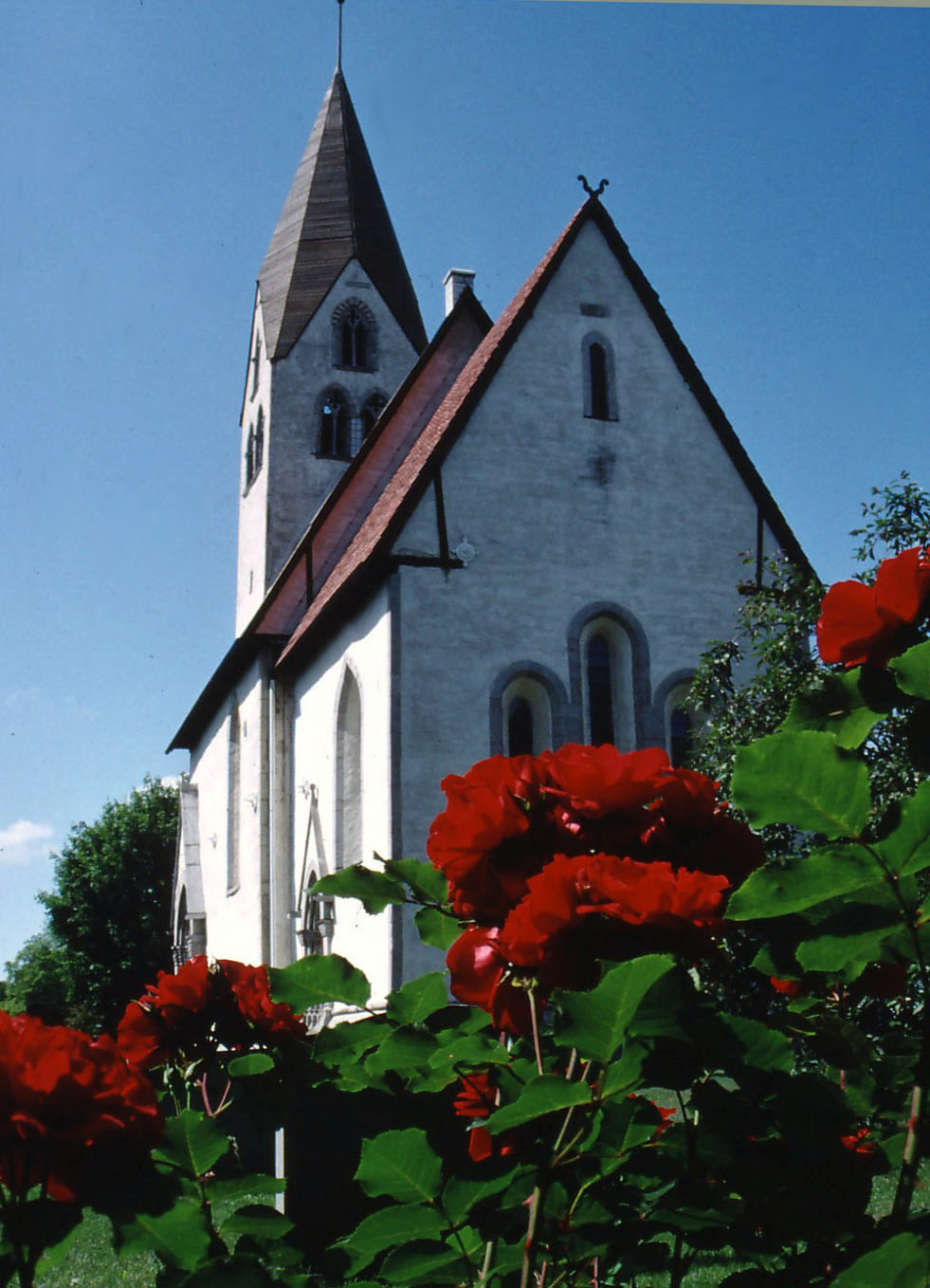
- Ekeby church

- Location within Gotland
- Coordinates: 57°35′24″N 18°30′52″E
- Country: Sweden
- Province: Gotland
- County: Gotland County
- Municipality: Gotland Municipality

Area
  - Total: 16.77 km^{2} (6.47 sq mi)

Population (2014)
  - Total: 298
- Time zone: UTC+1 (CET)
  - Summer (DST): UTC+2 (CEST)

Ekeby is a populated area, a socken (not to be confused with parish), on the Swedish island of Gotland. It comprises the same area as the administrative Ekeby District, established on 1 January 2016.

== Geography ==
Ekeby is situated in the northern central part of Gotland. The medieval Ekeby Church is located in the socken. As of 2019, Ekeby Church belongs to Dalhem parish in Romaklosters pastorat, along with the churches in Dalhem, Ganthem and Hörsne.
