= Ekeby Church =

- Ekeby kyrka
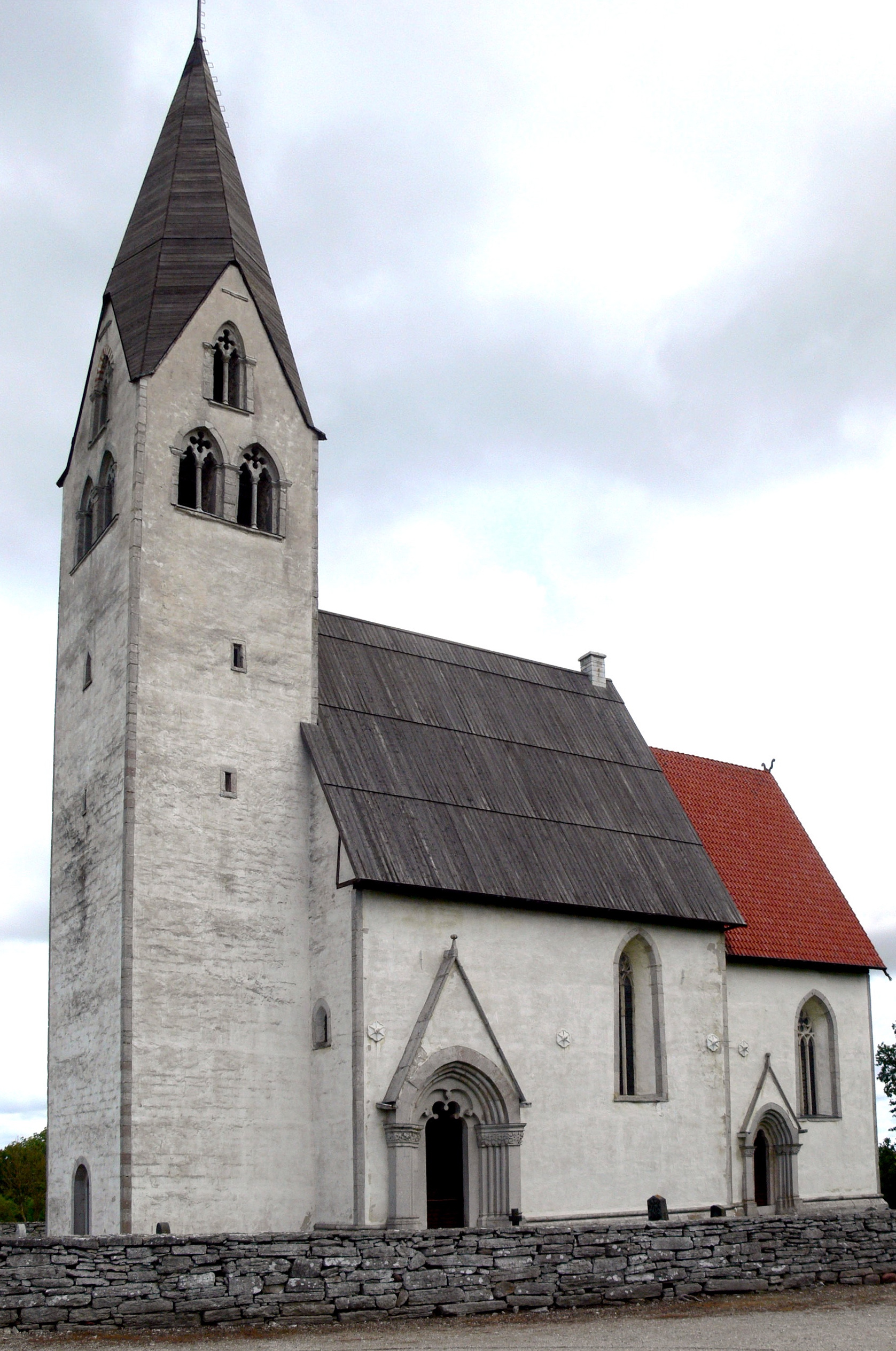
- Ekeby Church, view of the exterior

- Location on Gotland
- 57°35′42″N 18°30′53″E
- Country: Sweden
- Denomination: Church of Sweden

Administration
- Diocese: Visby

Ekeby Church (Swedish: Ekeby kyrka) is a medieval church in Ekeby on the Swedish island of Gotland. The oldest parts date from the 12th century, and the church has been little altered since the end of the 13th century. Its interior is richly decorated with medieval murals. It belongs to the Church of Sweden and lies in the Diocese of Visby.

== History and architecture ==
The church is constructed of limestone. The oldest part of Ekeby Church is the tower, dating from the end of the 12th century and Romanesque in style. The nave and choir are circa one century younger and Gothic in style. At the end of the 13th century, the tower was also heightened to its present height. The two southern portals are richly decorated with sculptures. These were originally painted, and fragments of colour survive.

Inside, the church is profusely decorated with medieval murals. The nave has murals from the 13th, 14th and 18th century, and the choir from the early 19th century in the form of blue trompe-l'œil draperies. Among the other murals, the large paintings depicting the apostles are the oldest, from the end of the 13th century. Under them are paintings done by the Master of the Passion of Christ depicting, on the northern wall, the Passion of Christ and, on the southern, the childhood of Jesus. During a renovation in 2004, further murals were discovered.

Originally, all the windows had stained glass panes, but today only a few original ones remain. Three conserved windows with glass paintings are from the end of the 13th century. An unusual niche in the choir, probably designed as a storage for the bread and wine from the Eucharist, retains remarkably well-preserved paintings from the end of the 13th century.

Among the furnishings, the accomplished Romanesque triumphal cross deserves mention. It is from the end of the 12th century. The sandstone baptismal font is also an unusually fine piece, from approximately the same time. Scholars believe that it may have been made by either Master Majestatis or Hegvald.

The church was restored in 1942–1943, under the direction of architect Olle Karth (1905–1965). A restoration of the exterior was also carried out in 1971-1972.

It is associated with the Diocese of Visby of the Church of Sweden.
