= Ganthem Church =

- Ganthem kyrka
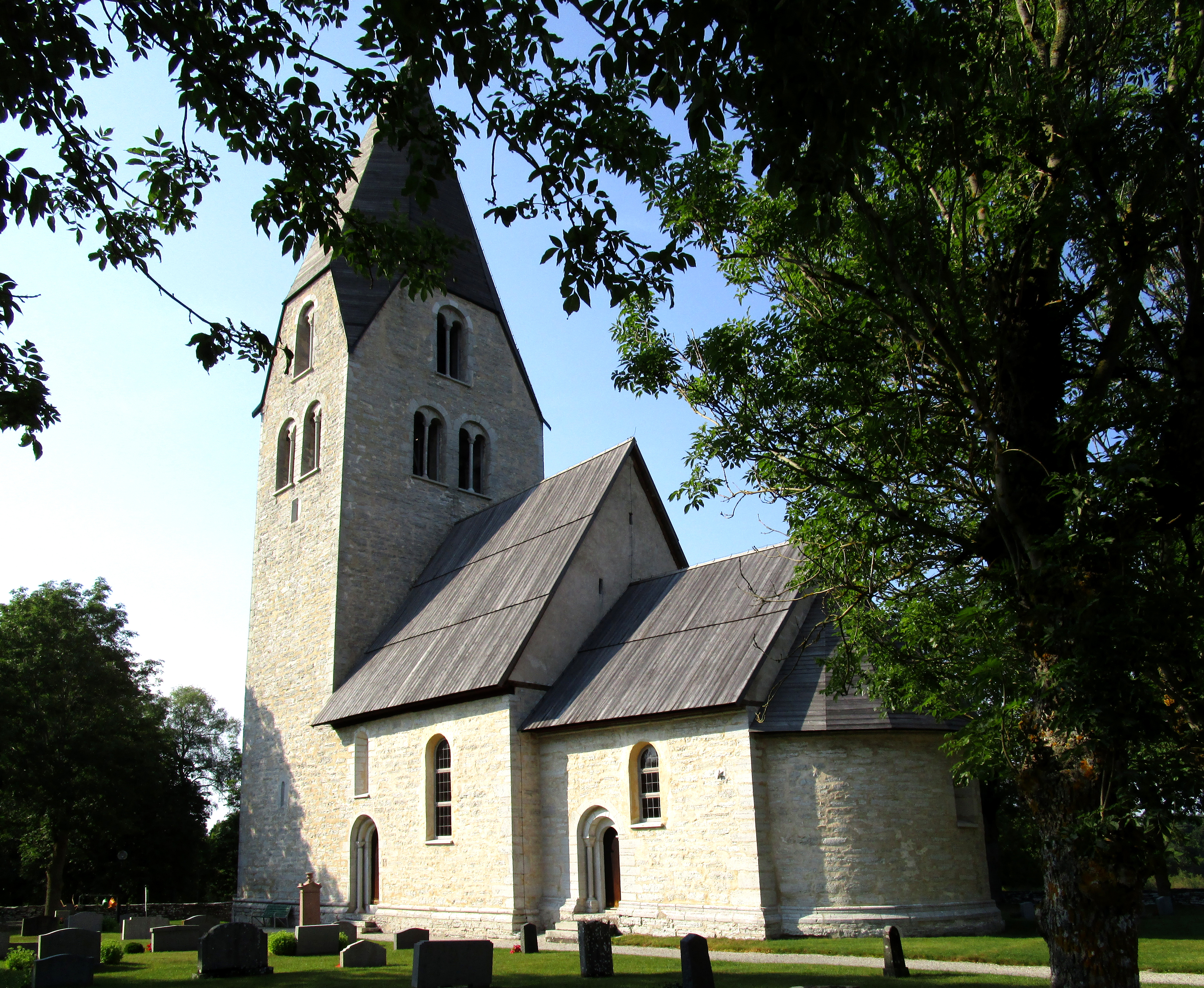
- Ganthem Church, view of the exterior

- Location on Gotland
- 57°30′52″N 18°34′54″E
- Country: Sweden
- Denomination: Church of Sweden

Administration
- Diocese: Visby

Ganthem Church (Swedish: Ganthems kyrka) is a well-preserved Romanesque church in Ganthem on the island of Gotland. It contains murals from the 15th century as well as a number of medieval furnishings. It lies in the Diocese of Visby (Sweden).

== History and architecture ==
Ganthem church is a well-preserved Romanesque church, finished in the middle of the 13th century. The choir with its apse is the oldest part, dating from the late 12th century. The nave is slightly later, from the beginning of the 13th century while the tower is the most recent addition. Apart from an enlargement of the windows made in the 19th century, and the addition of a sacristy in the 1930s, the church has remained unchanged since the 13th century.

The interior of the church is decorated with murals from the 15th century. On the northern wall, a set of paintings depict the Passion of Christ. This set is unusual inasmuch as it has never been painted over, and has retained much of its original vibrancy. On the southern wall, another set of murals depicts other religious subjects.

The church still contains a number of medieval items. The baptismal font is from the latter half of the 14th century and has been ascribed to the artist Hegvald. The triumphal cross is from circa 1200 and unusually well-preserved. The altarpiece is furthermore a copy of the original, 14th-century altarpiece now belonging to the Swedish History Museum.
