= Lövsta, Gotland =

Lövsta Roma kyrkby
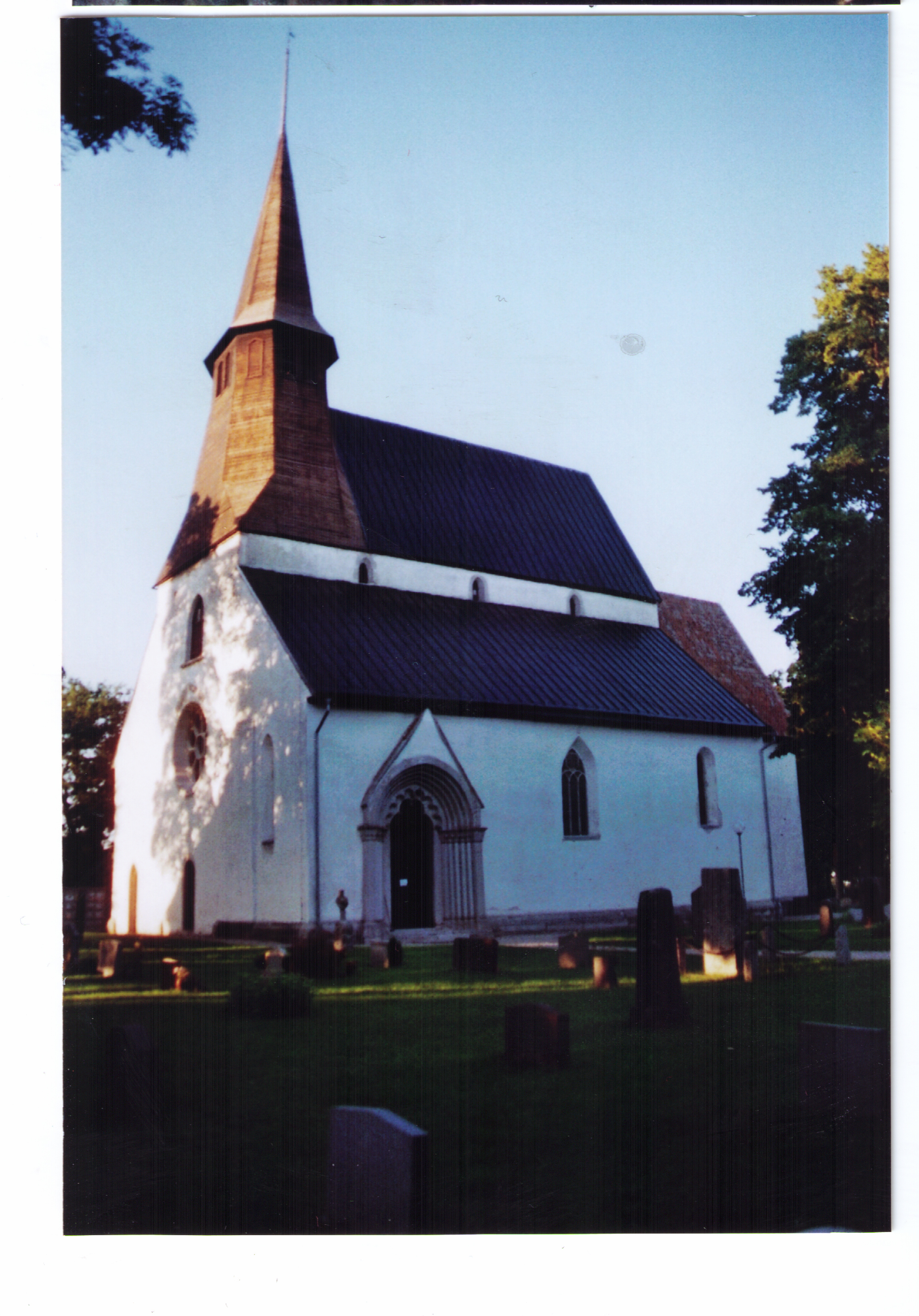
- Roma Church, located in Roma kyrkby/Lövsta

- Location within Gotland
- Coordinates: 57°32′N 18°26′E
- Country: Sweden
- Province: Gotland
- County: Gotland County
- Municipality: Gotland Municipality

Area
  - Total: 0.89 km^{2} (0.34 sq mi)

Population (31 December 2010)
  - Total: 261
  - Density: 292/km^{2} (760/sq mi)
- Time zone: UTC+1 (CET)
  - Summer (DST): UTC+2 (CEST)

Lövsta (also known as Roma kyrkby) is a locality on the Swedish island of Gotland, with 261 inhabitants in 2010.

In 1995 the locality known as Roma was divided by Statistics Sweden into a part with the tentative name of "Roma kyrkby" (pop. 277) and the remaining part that was referred to as Roma (pop. 902). It was given the name "Romakloster" as a postal address to avoid confusion with the Italian capital. Some confusion is caused by the fact that Lövsta/Roma kyrkby has been referred to as "Roma" in the statistical figures since 2000.

The medieval Roma Church is in Lövsta. As of 2019, Roma Church belongs to Roma parish in Romaklosters pastorat.
