= Roma Church =

- Roma kyrka
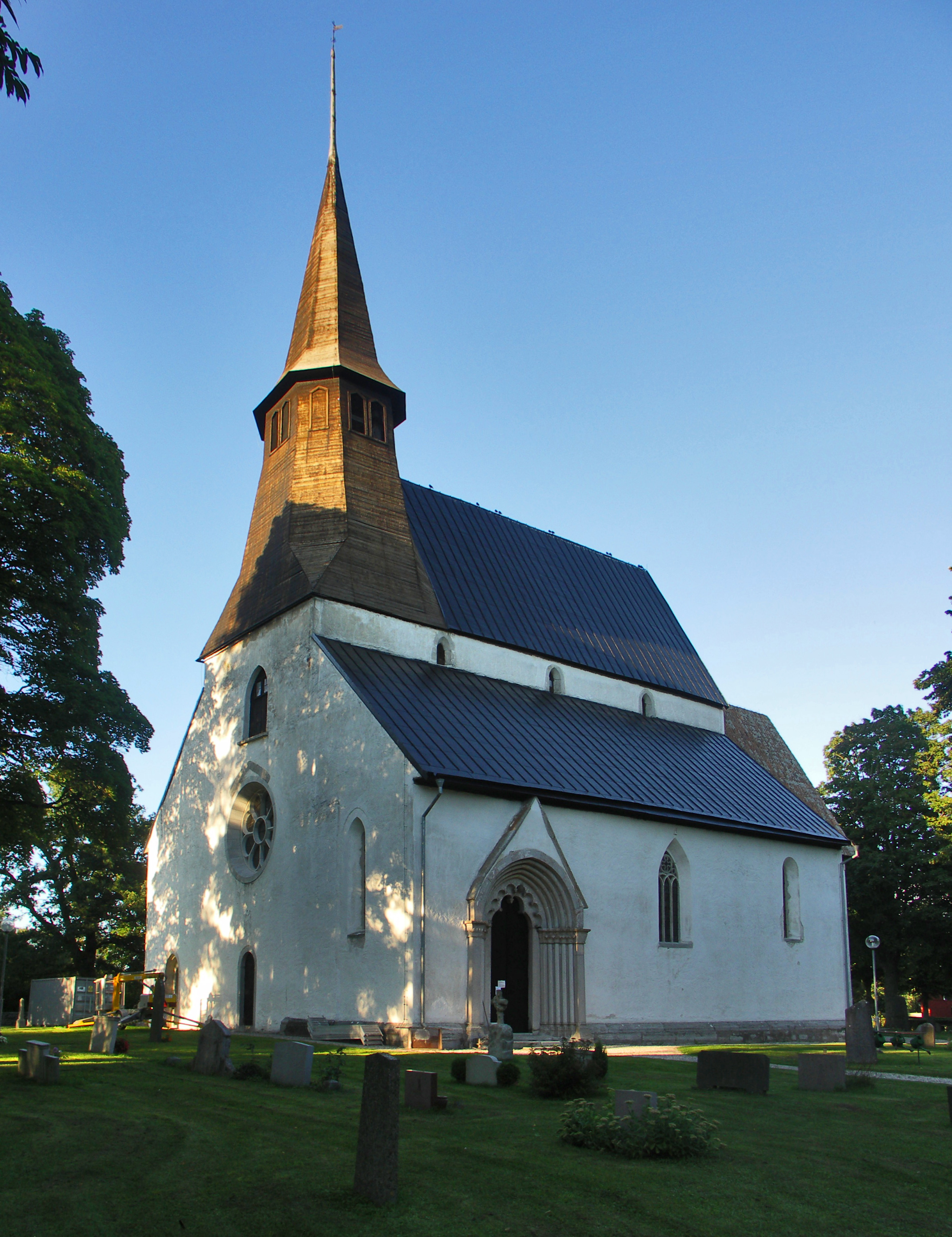
- Roma Church, view of the exterior

- Location on Gotland
- 57°31′42″N 18°26′31″E
- Country: Sweden
- Denomination: Church of Sweden

Administration
- Diocese: Visby

Roma Church (Swedish: Roma kyrka) is a medieval church in Lövsta, Gotland (Sweden). The church is one of the largest countryside churches on Gotland. Built during the 13th century, it displays influences from Cistercian architecture and may have been used by Dominicans preaching for the Northern Crusades. It belongs to the Church of Sweden and lies in the Diocese of Visby.

== History ==
The presently visible church was preceded by a considerably smaller, Romanesque church. Some fragments from this church have been re-used and incorporated in the façade of the later church. The still extant sacristy is also a remnant of this earlier church.

The earlier church was torn down and successively replaced with one more Gothic in style during the 13th century. It was built between 1215 and 1255; dendrochronological examinations have shown that the latest additions were made in 1280. The nave and choir seem to have been erected during a single period of construction, possibly with the exception for the westernmost part of the nave, which is slightly different in style. A tower was evidently planned for the church but never executed. Influences for the somewhat unusual architecture may have come from nearby Roma Abbey and thus the traditions of Cistercian architecture. The church has remained largely unaltered since the Middle Ages. The large western rose window was however added in the 1880s and the church underwent a renovation in 1902.

The church seems to have had a special function. It was built close to the location of the thing of all of Gotland, and not far from a Cistercian monastery, Roma Abbey. Unlike a regular church, it had five entrances (instead of three) and its architecture differs from other churches on Gotland. The likeness of the church with that of the Dominicans in Visby (now ruined) is noticeable. There is therefore reason to believe that the church may have been used by the Dominicans, possibly to preach for crusades against non-Christians in what is today the Baltic states.

== Architecture ==
The church externally has the shape of a basilica; inside, however, it is a hall church. For this reason it has been called a "false basilica". It is one of the largest on the countryside of Gotland and in fact may well have been the largest when finished. The somewhat larger Lau Church was only finished slightly later. The floor space is circa 400 square metres (4,300 sq ft) and the highest vault reaches around 10 metres (33 ft). The vaults are carried by four pillars. The fact that the church lacks medieval murals may be because of influences from nearby Cistercian Roma Abbey.

The interior is characterised by the renovation in Neo-Gothic style from 1902. The interior is relatively dark, and few medieval furnishings survive. The altarpiece and the pews date from 1902. An older altarpiece has been transferred to one of the nave walls; it dates from 1656. A few medieval tombstones are displayed in the church, and the baptismal font is also medieval. Dating from the 13th century, it has no equivalents on Gotland but has more in common with baptismal fonts from Småland and Östergötland from the time.

In the cemetery, there is a bell tower in which three bells hang. Before 1929, these bells belonged to the Swedish-speaking minority village of Gammalsvenskby in Ukraine. A few hundred metres from the church there is furthermore a copy of a farmhouse from Gammalsvensby, built by volunteers in 1977.
