= Ganthem =

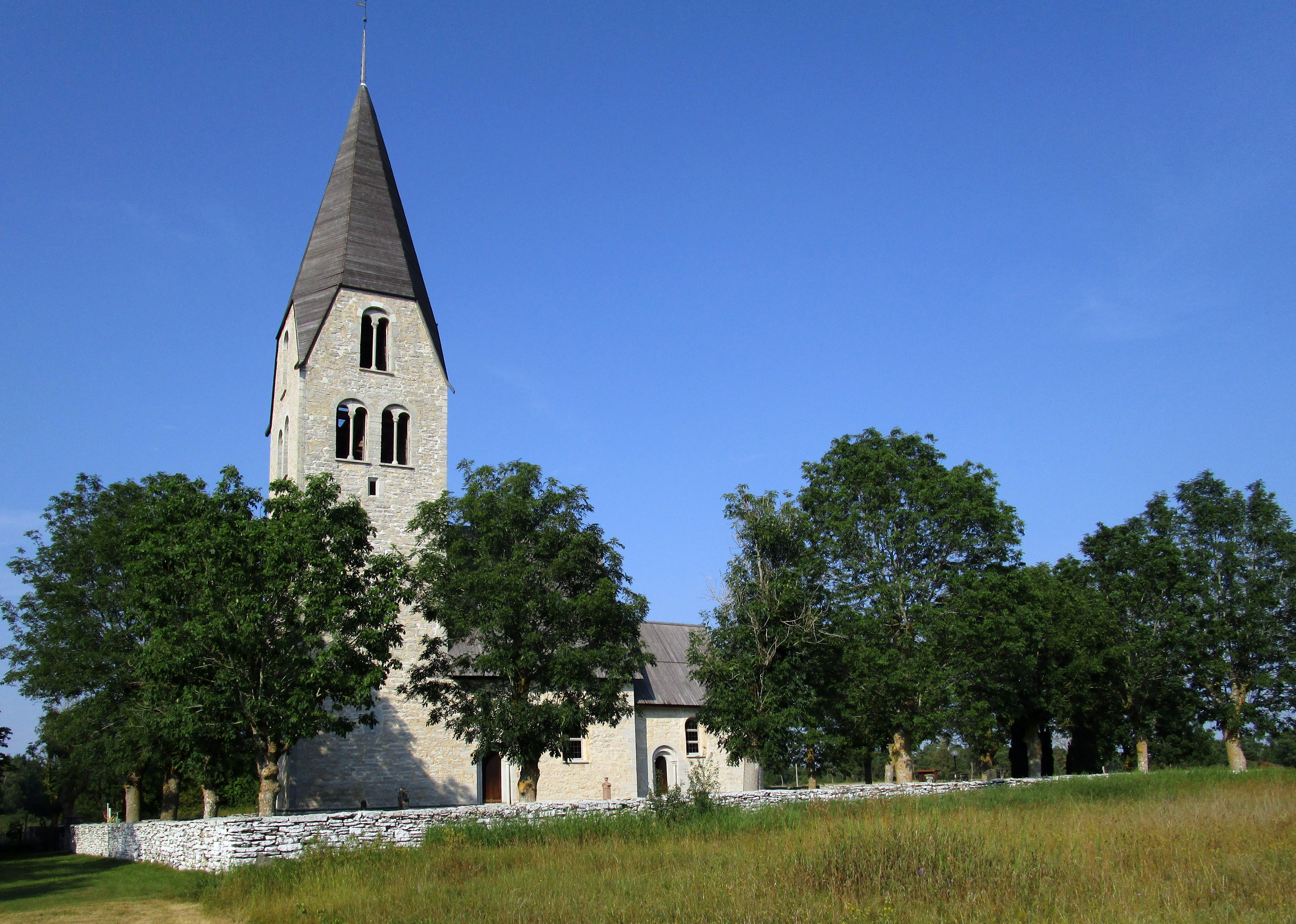
- Ganthem Church

- Location within Gotland
- Coordinates: 57°30′52″N 18°34′54″E
- Country: Sweden
- Province: Gotland
- County: Gotland County
- Municipality: Gotland Municipality

Area
  - Total: 23.32 km^{2} (9.00 sq mi)

Population (2014)
  - Total: 108
- Time zone: UTC+1 (CET)
  - Summer (DST): UTC+2 (CEST)

Ganthem is a populated area, a socken (not to be confused with parish), on the Swedish island of Gotland. It comprises the same area as the administrative Ganthem District, established on 1 January 2016.

== Geography ==
Ganthem is situated in the central east part of Gotland. The medieval Ganthem Church is located in the socken. As of 2019, Ganthem Church belongs to Dalhem parish in Romaklosters pastorat, along with the churches in Dalhem, Hörsne and Ekeby.
