= Dalhem, Gotland =

Dalhem Dalhem and Hallvide
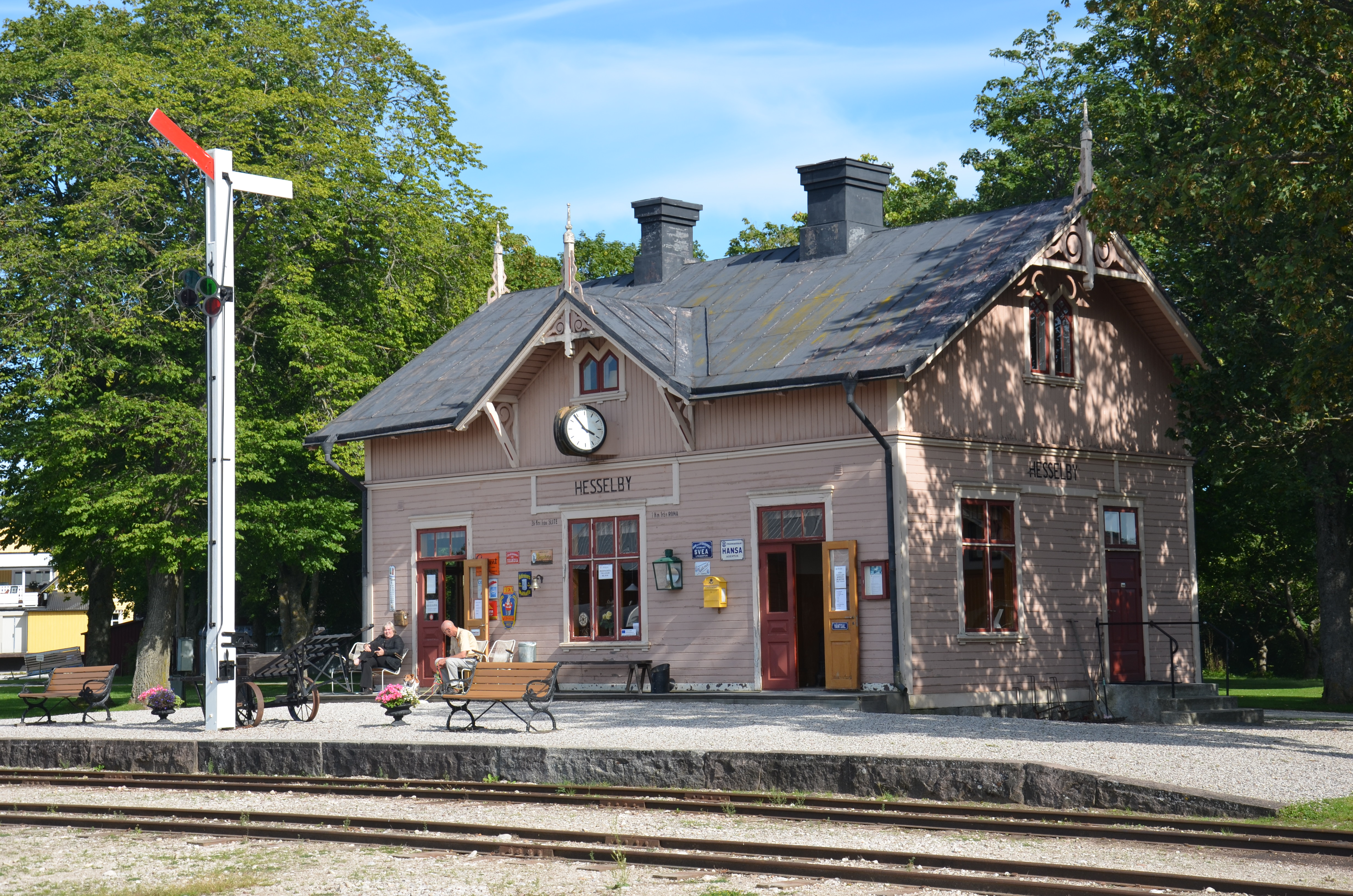
- The old Hesselby station in Dalhem

- Location within Gotland
- Coordinates: 57°33′7″N 18°31′56″E
- Country: Sweden
- Province: Gotland
- County: Gotland County
- Municipality: Gotland Municipality

Area
  - Total: 049 km^{2} (19 sq mi)

Population (2014)
  - Total: 485
- Time zone: UTC+1 (CET)
  - Summer (DST): UTC+2 (CEST)

Dalhem (also referred to as Dalhem and Hallvide), is a populated area, a socken (not to be confused with parish), on the Swedish island of Gotland. It comprises the same area as the administrative Dalhem District, established on 1 January 2016.

== Geography ==
Dalhem is the name of the socken as well as the district. It is also the name of the small village surrounding the medieval Dalhem Church, sometimes referred to as Dalhem kyrkby. It is situated in central Gotland. The area is rural with farms, tourism and equestrian facilities as the main sources of income.

As of 2019, Dalhem Church belongs to Dalhem parish in Romaklosters pastorat, along with the churches in Ganthem, Hörsne and Ekeby.

The Dunbodi General Store Museum in Dalhem, is a shop from the early 1900s, preserved as a museum.

== Railway ==
The narrow-gauge railway on Gotland was decommissioned in the beginning of the 1960s. However, short parts of the railway tracks are still preserved. The most well-kept of these is the railway at Dalhem. Built in 1900–1902, it was originally 33 km (21 mi) long. With the latest restoration finished in 2015, the preserved part, known as the Gotland Hesselby Railway (Gotlands Hesselby Jernväg), is 6.6 km (4.1 mi) long. The railway is maintained by the Gotland Train Association (Föreningen Gotlandståget).

== Gallery ==
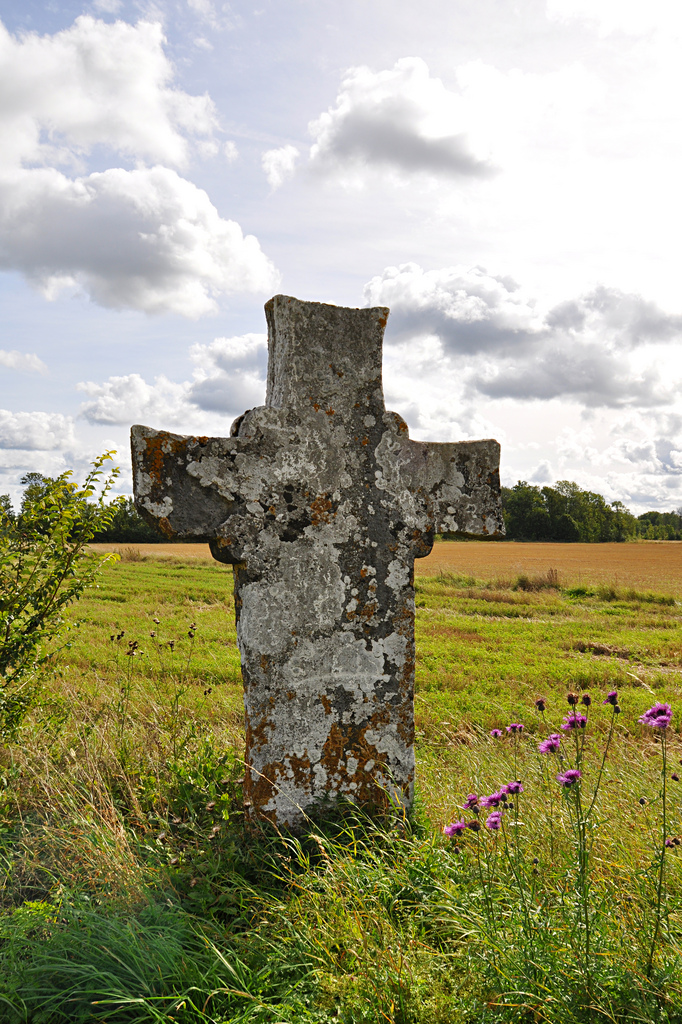
Hans Krok's cross

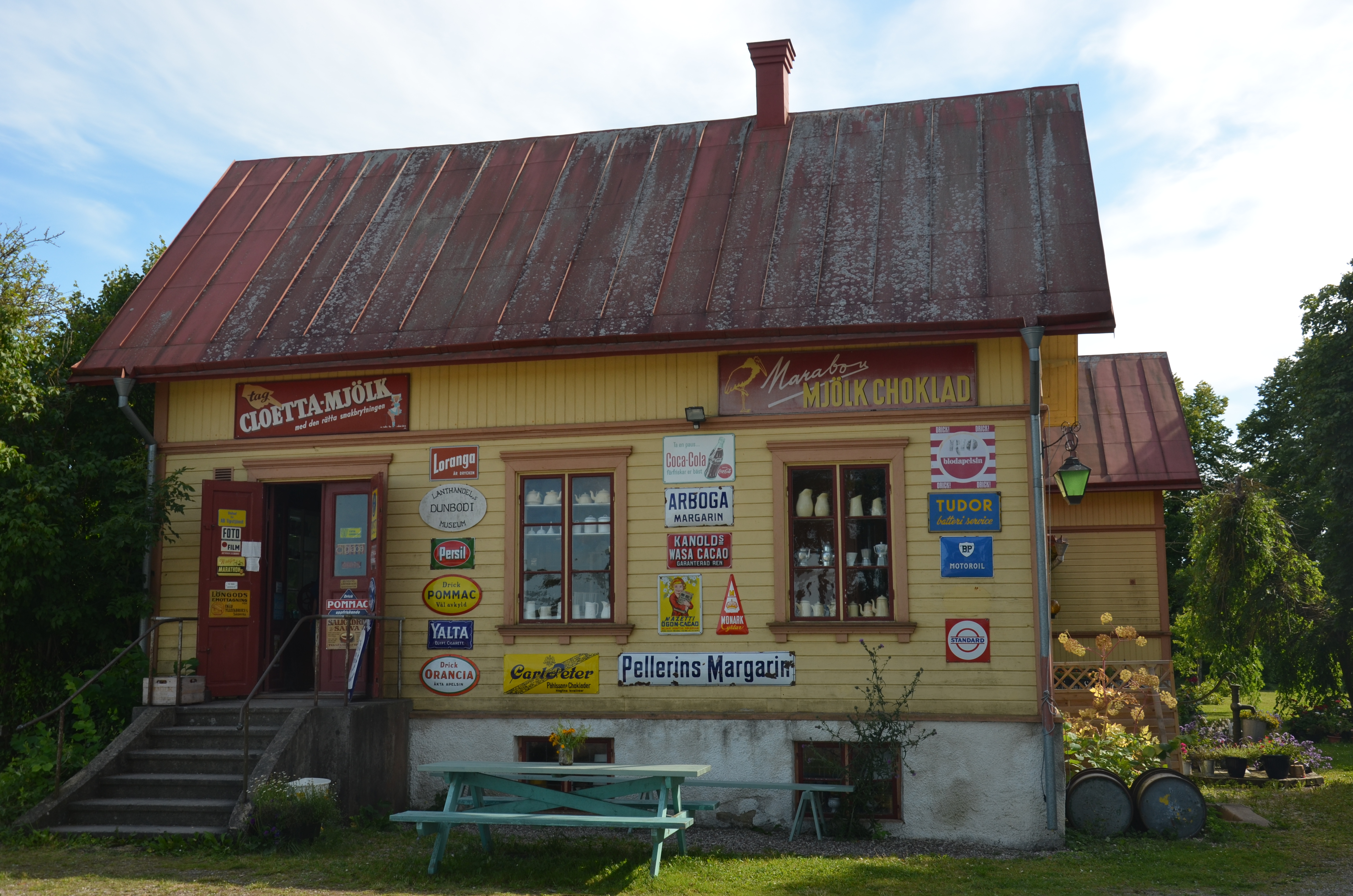
Dunbodi General Store Museum

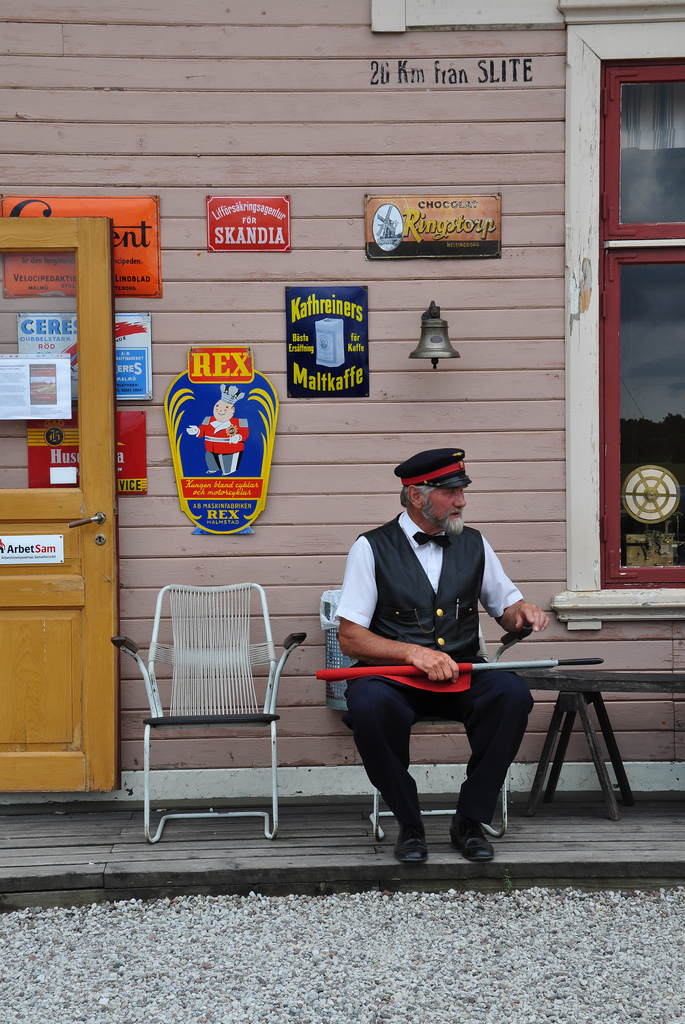
Hesselby railway museum

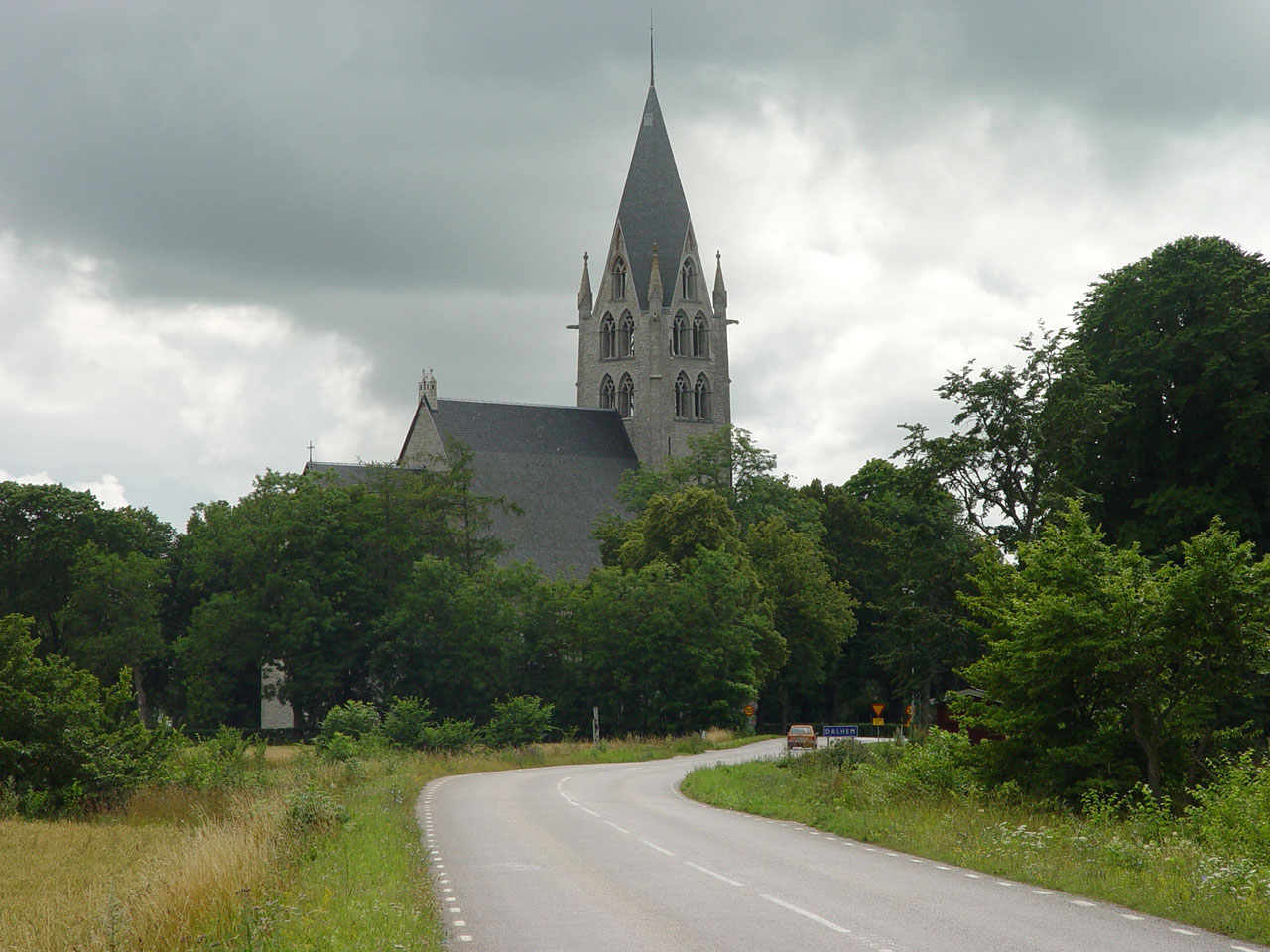
Dalhem Church
