= Roma Abbey =

Crown estate and a ruined Cisterian abbey in Gotland

Coordinates: 57.5162°N 18.4604°E

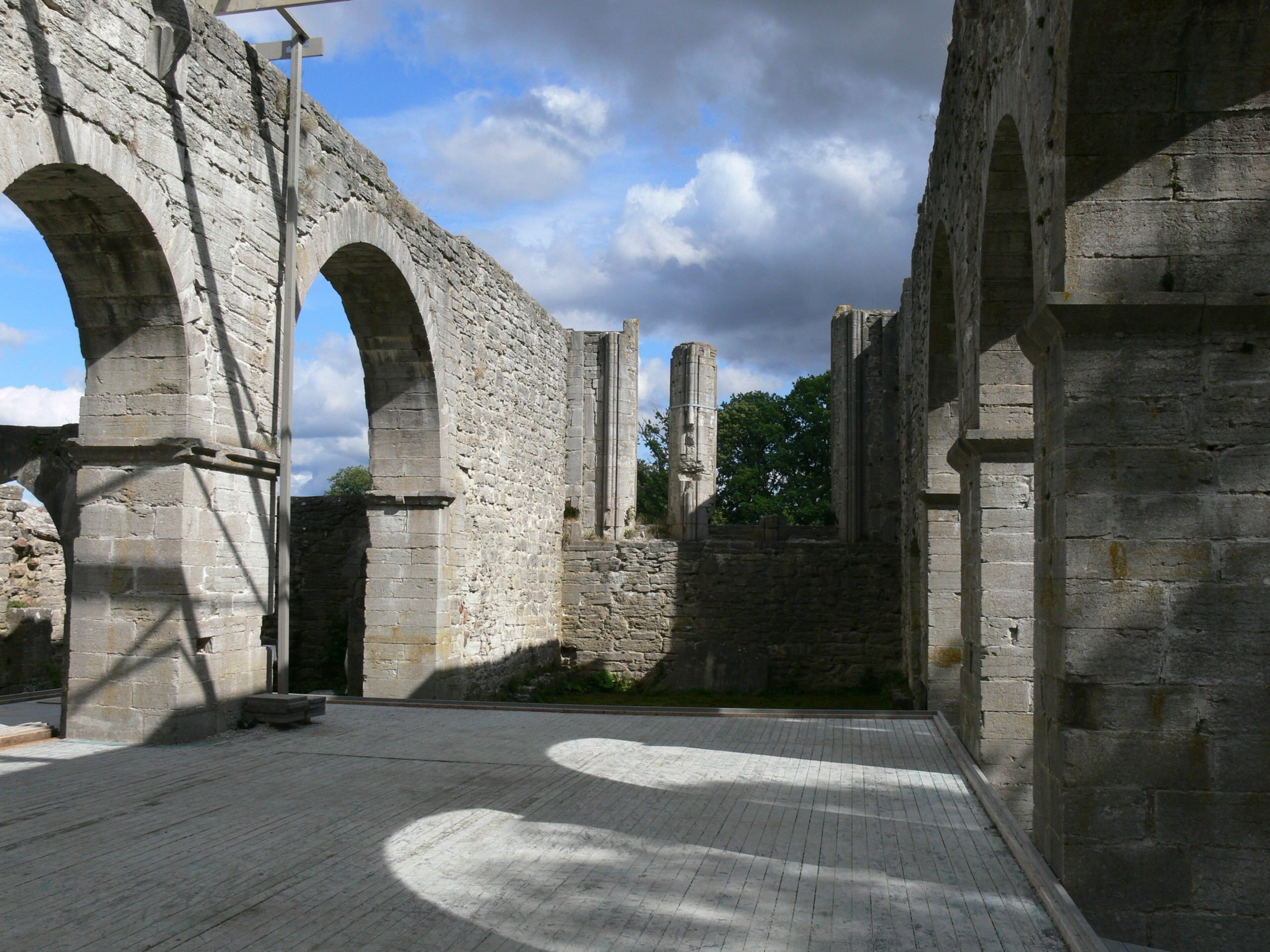
The ruined abbey church, view towards east

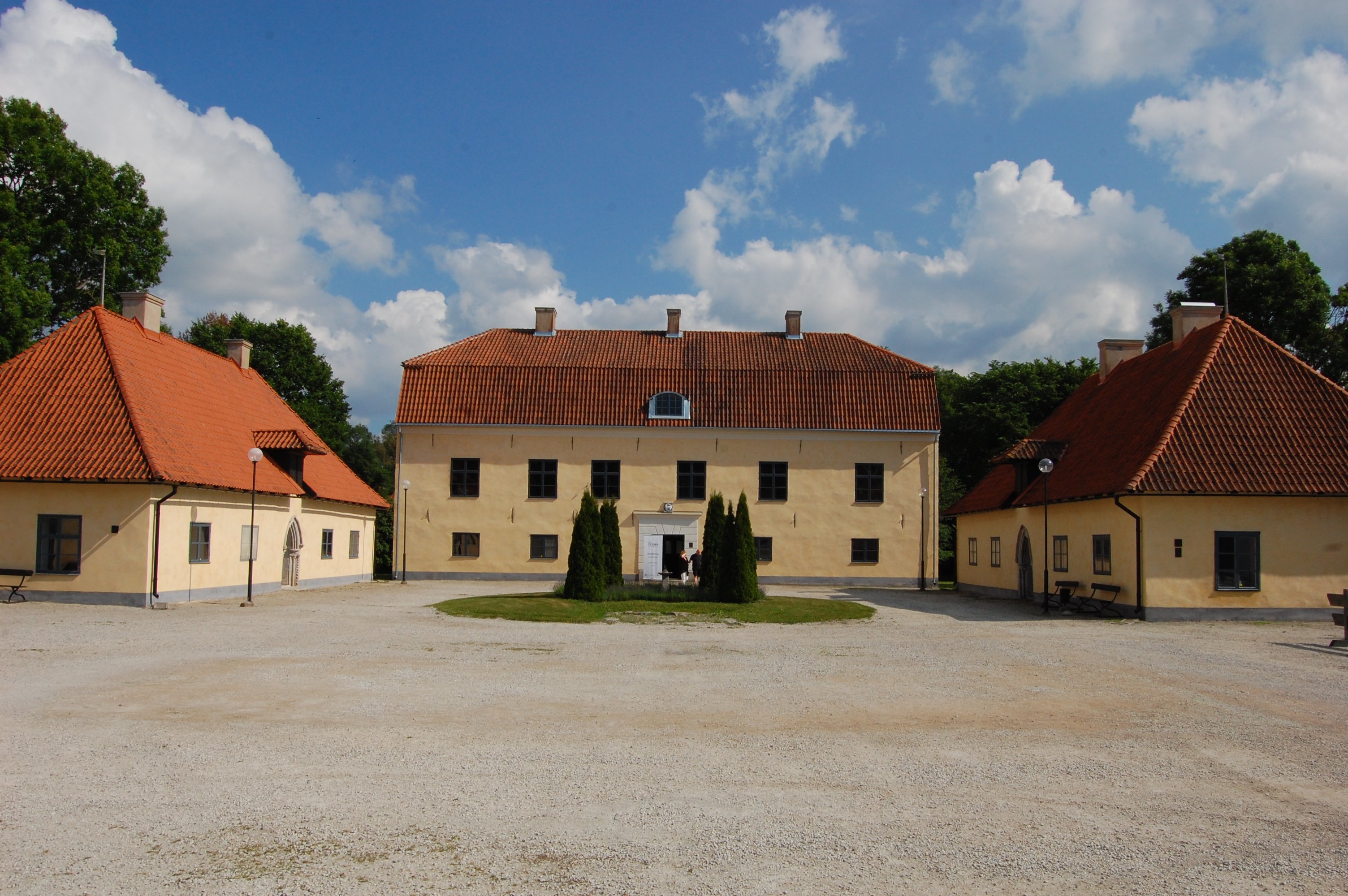
The front courtyard of the crown estate manor

Roma Abbey (Swedish: Roma kloster) is a ruined Cistercian abbey and a crown estate in Roma on the Swedish island of Gotland. The abbey was built in the 12th century. After the Reformation, its lands were confiscated by the Crown and subsequently turned into a crown estate. Apart from the ruined church, the estate includes a manor house built in 1733 for the crown estate, known in Swedish as Roma kungsgård. The manorial cultural landscape with avenues and large fields surrounding the ruined church and the manor is unique on Gotland.

== History ==
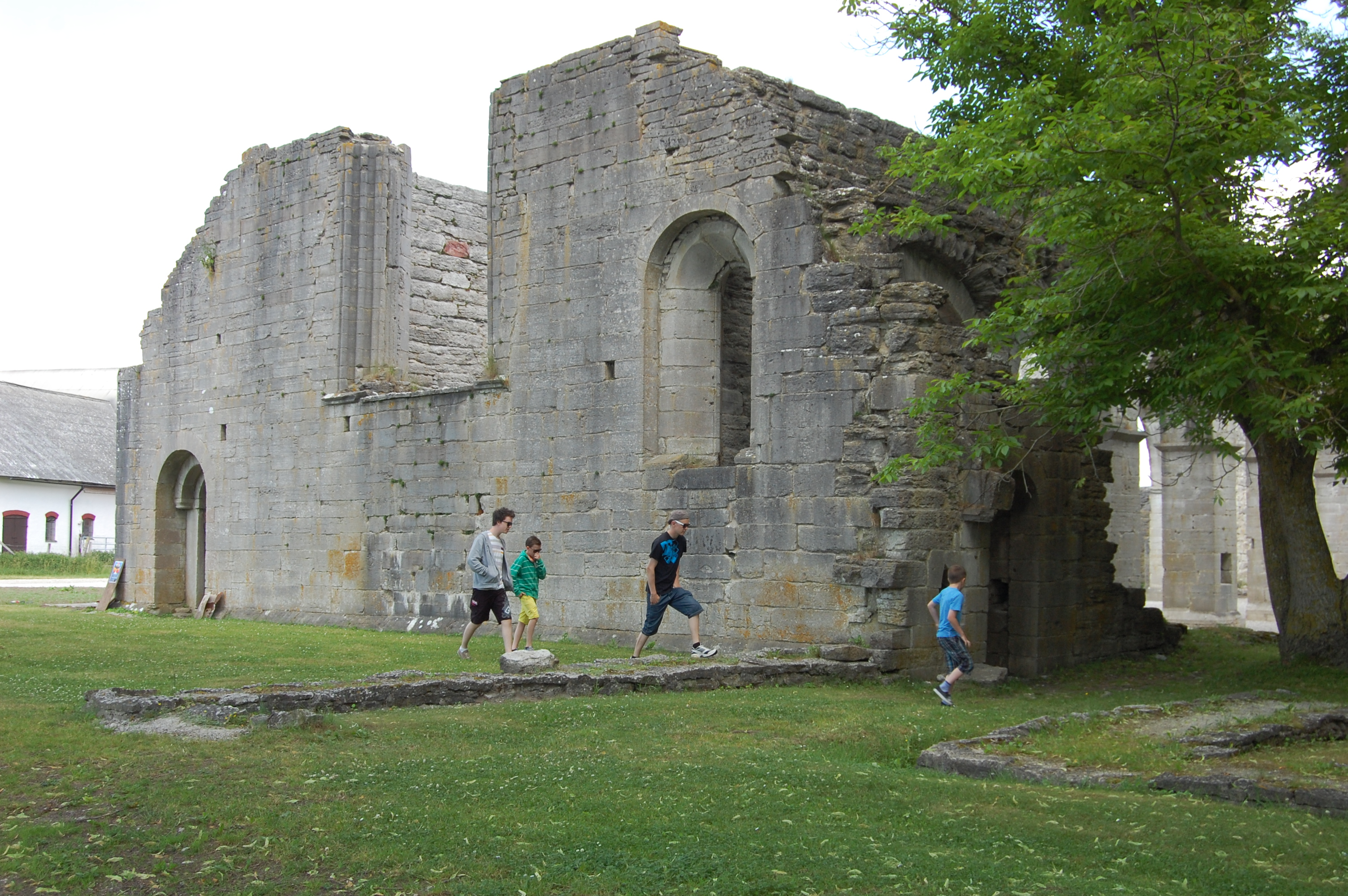
The ruined abbey church, the west façade

Roma Abbey is located in an area with old cultural traditions. The thing for all of Gotland was located on this strategical location on the middle of the islands, possibly as early as the Viking Age. Usually during the Middle Ages, abbeys like Roma were founded on land donated by the land-owning aristocracy, and the absence of any such group on Gotland may explain the location of the abbey. The land around the thing was common property and could therefore be used for founding an abbey. The abbey was founded in 1164 by Cistercian monks from Nydala Abbey in Småland on mainland Sweden. Its name in Latin was Sancta Maria de Gutnalia. Eventually the abbey grew in importance and acquired large landholdings both on Gotland and in the present-day Baltic states. The abbey had particularly large holdings on Saaremaa island and in present-day mainland Estonia.

During the Reformation, the abbey was disbanded and its lands on Gotland confiscated by the Danish Crown circa 1531 (as Gotland at the time belonged to Denmark). The abbey was converted into the seat of the Danish governor, and the buildings that no longer served any direct purpose were left to decay. After the Peace of Brömsebro in 1645, when Gotland became Swedish, it became the property of the Swedish Crown. In practice, the change of ownership meant few tangible changes for the estate. Towards the end of the 17th century, the Swedish Crown had put the land out for rent as a leasehold estate. In 1728 it befell the governor of Gotland, Johan Didrik Grönhagen. He constructed the manor house, partially using building material from the abbey.

During World War II, a military airfield was established nearby and the manor house and its annexes were used by the military up until the 1990s. During this time the abbey suffered further neglect and damage.

Today the abbey and the manor are owned by the National Property Board of Sweden. During summer theatre plays are staged among the ruins, a tradition that was initiated in 1989 and today attracts as many as 25,000 visitors every year, according to the organisers.

== Architecture ==
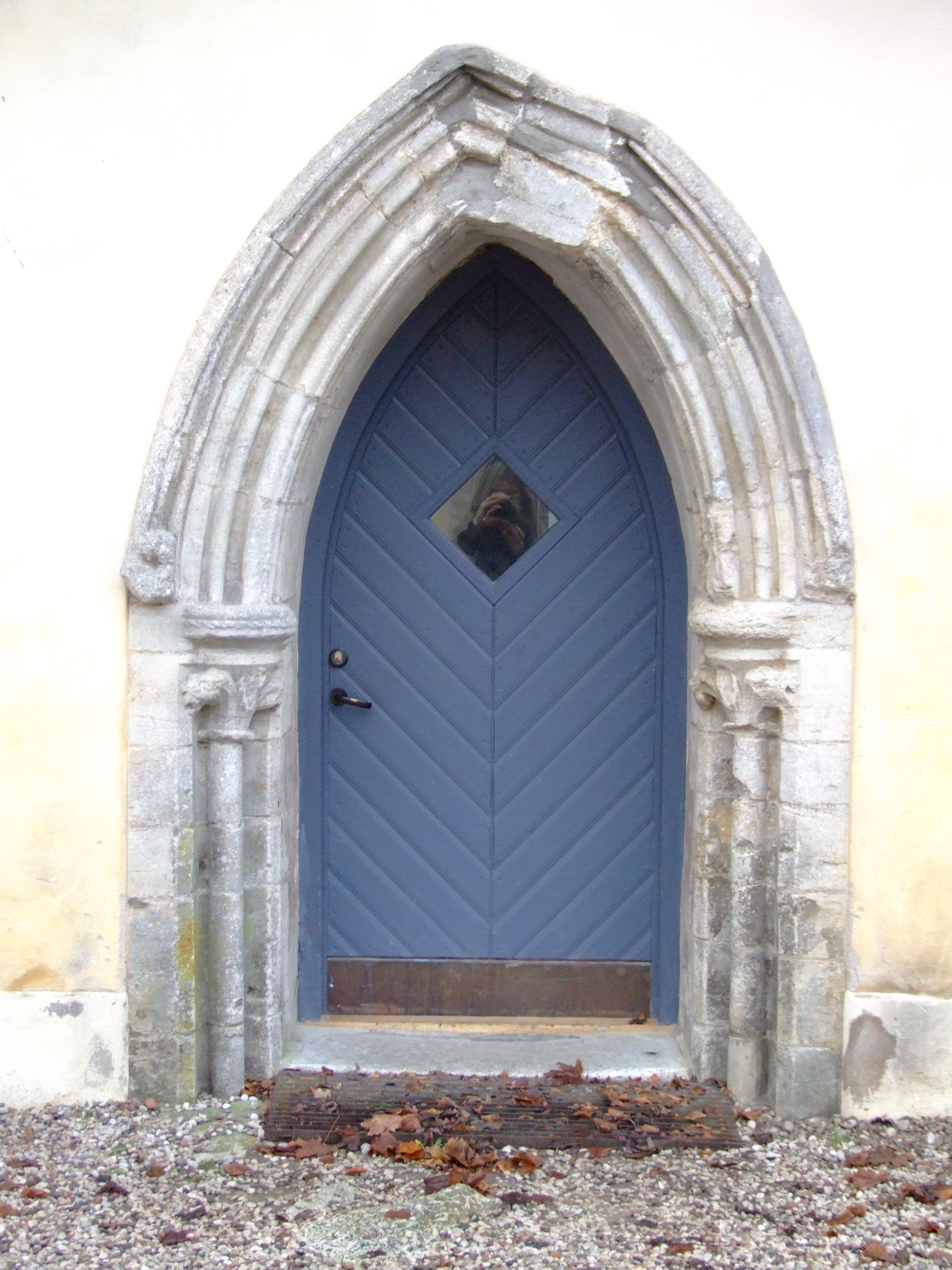
Medieval portal incorporated in the manor

=== Manor ===
The manor house, unique in its kind on Gotland, was modelled after the manors of the aristocracy on the mainland. Building material was taken from the ruined abbey, and a few medieval portals were incorporated in the new building.

=== Abbey ===
Although the abbey church has been ruined and neglected for several centuries, it can still be appreciated as a typical representative of Cistercian architecture. The carefully proportioned church belongs to a type of church which is today best represented by the Abbey of Fontenay in France. The church was a basilica with a single nave flanked by two aisles. It was divided by a transept and instead of an apse had a straight east wall. In each of the transept arms there were two chapels. The church is characterised by a neat treatment of materials and a sobriety in the choice of decorations.

== See also ==
- List of church ruins on Gotland
- Churches on Gotland
