= Gotland Hesselby Railway =

Narrow gauge museum railway in Gotland, Sweden

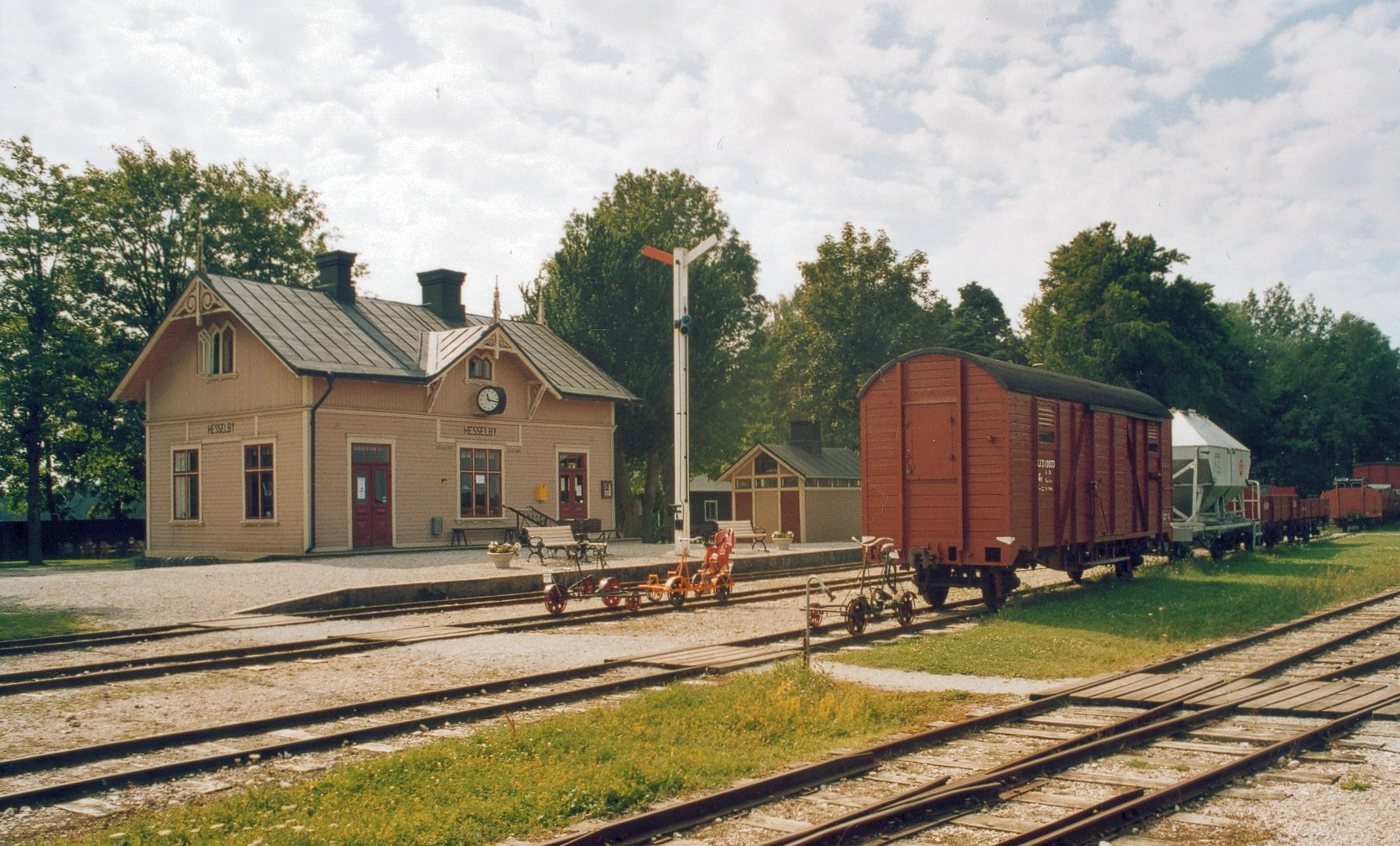
- Hesselby station

Overview
- Native name: Gotlands Hesselby Jernväg
- Status: Operational
- Owner: Gotland Train Association
- Locale: Gotland, Sweden
- Coordinates: 57.544847°N 18.531520°E
- Termini: Hesselby, Gotland; Roma, Gotland
- Stations: 8
- Website: http://www.gotlandstaget.se/

Service
- Type: Museum railway
- Services: 1
- Operator: Gotland Train Association
- Depot: Hesselby

History
- Opened: 1978

Technical
- Line length: 6.5 km (4.0 mi)
- Number of tracks: single track
- Character: surface
- Track gauge: 891 mm (2 ft 11 3/32 in) Swedish three foot
- Electrification: no

Gotlands Hesselby Jernväg (Gotland Hesselby Railway, GHJ), is a 6.5 km-long narrow-gauge museum railway, with a gauge of 891 mm, running through Dalhem, Halla and Roma socken on the Swedish island of Gotland.

== History ==
In 1969, the Gotland Railway Museum association was formed to save the museum train that the Swedish Railway Museum had parked at Romaskloster station in Roma in 1963. Faced with the threat that the train and carriages that had been left to decay at the site would be moved to the mainland, the Gotland Train Association (Föreningen Gotlandståget) was formed in 1972 to save the train set and keep it on the island. The Hesselby station area in Dalhem socken was purchased. Soon further ideas had arisen to recreate a length of track with remaining rolling stock from the Gotland railway era. The railway was revived in 1975 when tracks were once again laid in Hesselby. Just in time for the 100th anniversary of the Gotland railways in 1978, the Association was able to inaugurate its one-kilometre-long museum railway, Gotlands Hesselby Jernväg. The station building, which for a while had served as a sheep shed, was renovated to its original appearance, as were the other buildings that were part of the station complex.

== Operation ==
GHJ runs historical museum trains, often with steam locomotives and carriages from the Gotland railway era. The route follows the old Slite-Roma railway's embankment whose tracks were torn up in 1958. The museum trains ran until 2012 between the Hesselby railway station in Dalhem past the Eken stop to the Munkebos stop.

The Gotland Train Association, which was formed in 1972, is a non-profit association whose purpose is to preserve the Gotland railway and which has operated the museum railway facility at Hesselby station in Dalhem since 1975. The first train ran in 1978 on the rebuilt route, which then ended at Eken. Later, the association worked on extending the line. The extension to the Munkebos stop opened in 2007 when the line was extended by roughly 300 metres. At the same time, the railway yard at Tule station, a former stop and loading area along the former line to the south, was rebuilt. Tule was added as a gift to the Gotland Railway association back in 1982 and the vision to rebuild the line was created even then and during the years 2011–2013 the line was extended to Tule station.

In 2014, the line was then extended to Roma Kungsgård station and that year museum traffic was operated between Hesselby and Roma Kungsgård, 5.7 km. The following year, on 14 May 2015, the last kilometre into Roma station was inaugurated and since then museum traffic has been operated on the whole line.

Gotland Railway operates the greater part of its traffic between 1 June and 31 September. The end of the season, Museum Railway Day, usually involves several trains in traffic and train meetings at Tule station. In 2014, this event attracted over 500 passengers.

The biggest day of traffic is the Santa Claus Train. The two Santa Claus Trains in 2013 and 2014 attracted more than 2,000 riders. Before 2013, the train was run to Eken where Santa Claus was then located. In 2013, Santa Claus moved to Tule, which created greater opportunities to carry out a good event. In 2014, trains were run to both Tule and Roma Kungsgård. The latter train consisted of a railbus borrowed from the Tjustbygden Railway Association (Tjustbygdens Järnvägsförening, TJF) in Västervik over on the Swedish mainland.

== Reconstruction 2011–2015 ==
In the autumn of 2011, the Association received a grant from the European Union of almost 4.3 million kronor to rebuild the line another four kilometres to Roma and to connect the two parts over farmland where the embankment had been obliterated. Hesselby and Tule were linked in December 2012, at which time a small ceremony was held at the site of the connection. Among other things, a golden spike was driven in where the tracks from each station met. The Hesselby–Munkebos–Tule section was inaugurated by Gotland County Governor Cecilia Schelin Seidegård in May 2013. That same autumn, work began on building the (Tule)–Kambshagtorp–Roma Kungsgård section. On 31 August 2014, this section was opened in connection with that year's edition of Museum Railway Day, and in the autumn of 2014, a number of Hesselby–Roma Kungsgård service days were run. At the same time, track construction continued towards Roma's new station and the whole route was opened to traffic in 2015. At New Year's 2015, the route in use was 5.7 km long and a total of 6.3 km of track had been laid. The completed Roma–Hesselby line was just over 6.5 km long.

== Future ==
After the expansion is completed, the Association's ambition is to develop the station complexes along the line and renovate more rolling stock to put into service. Among other things, they have a steam locomotive from the Klintehamn–Roma Railway, a number of passenger carriages from the Gotland Railway and a unique railcar from the Mönsterås–Åseda Railway in the process of being renovated.

The Gotland Train Association's ambition is to strengthen collaborations between different tourist destinations in the area to give the socken of Roma, Halla and Dalhem greater opportunities to be attractive to tourists.

In addition to operating the railway itself, the Gotland Train Association also publishes the magazine Spårstumpen ("The Track Stub").

== Images ==
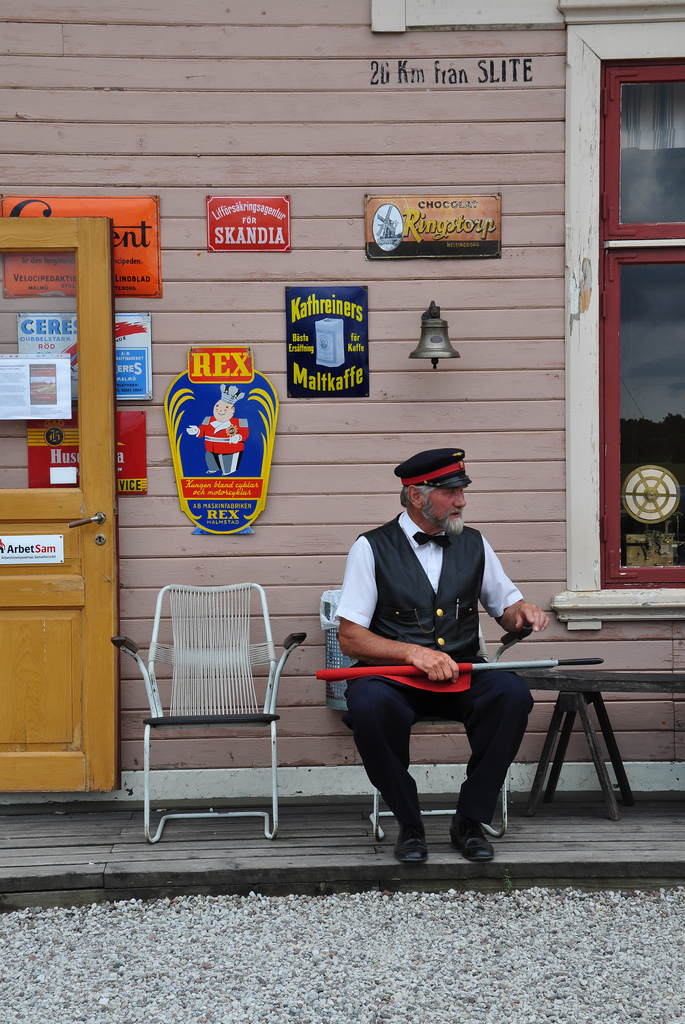
Hesselby station, detail

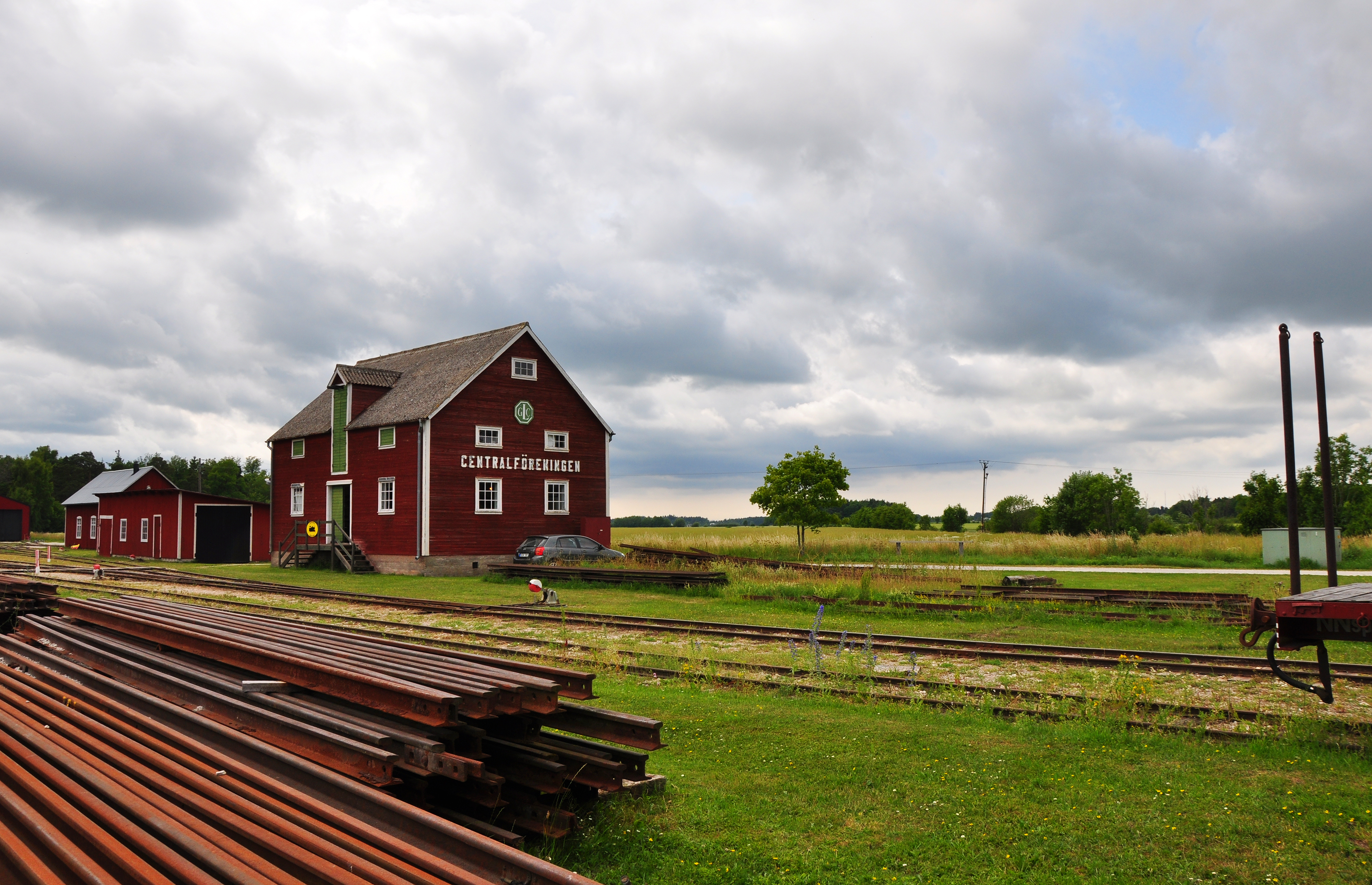
Warehouse built by the Gotland Lantmännens Centralförening (GLC) in 1939

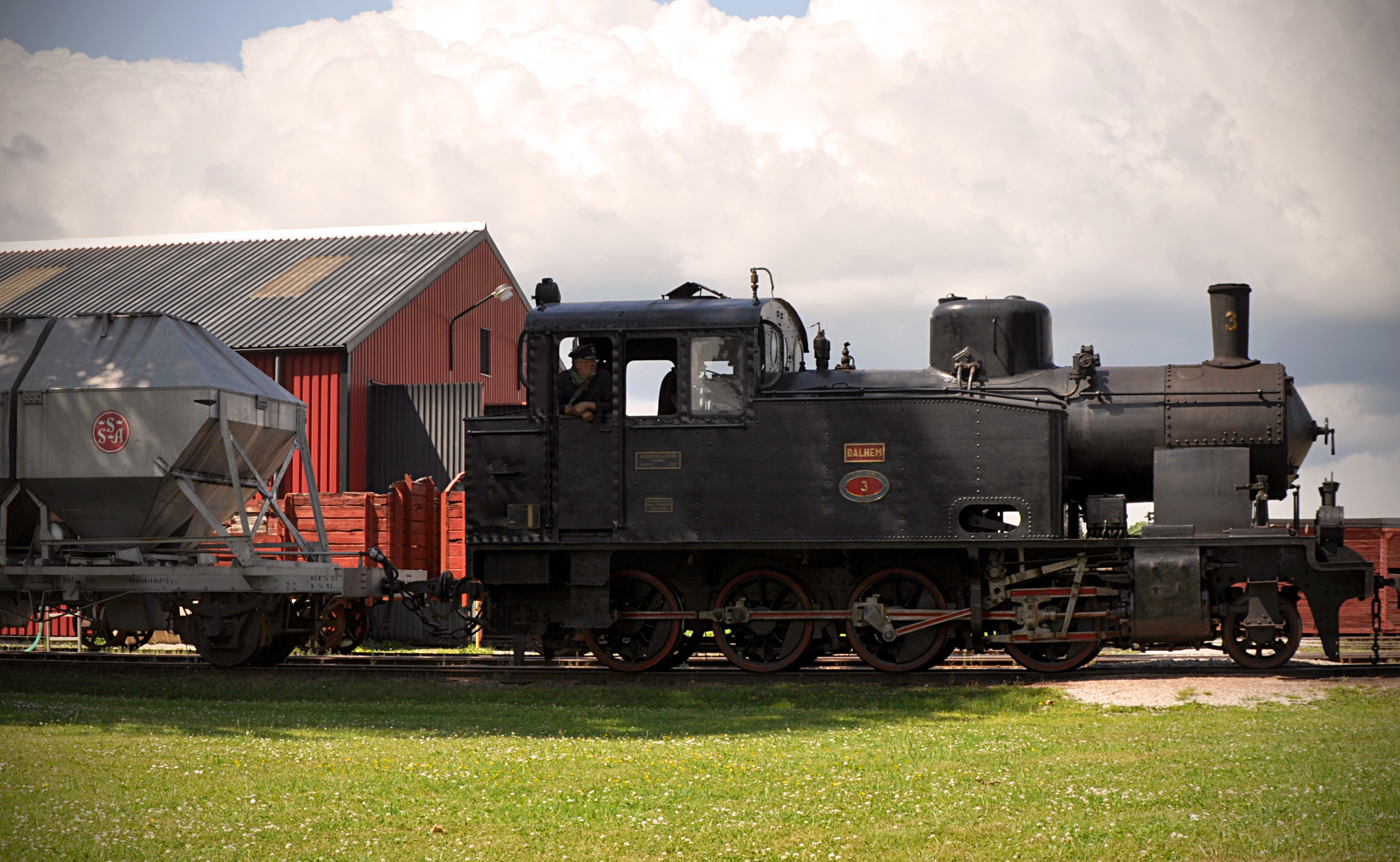
Dalhem steam locomotive

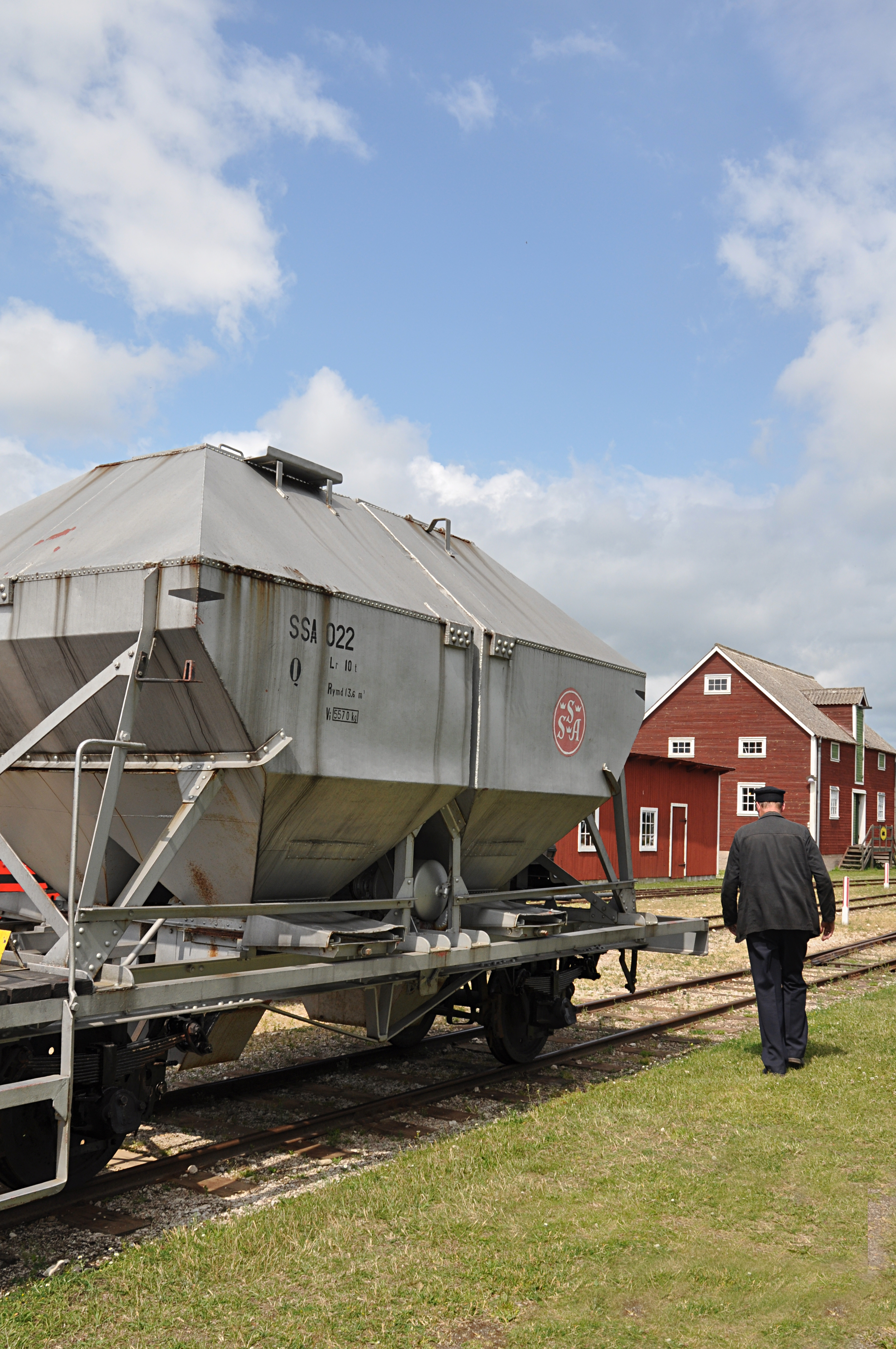
SSA sugar hopper

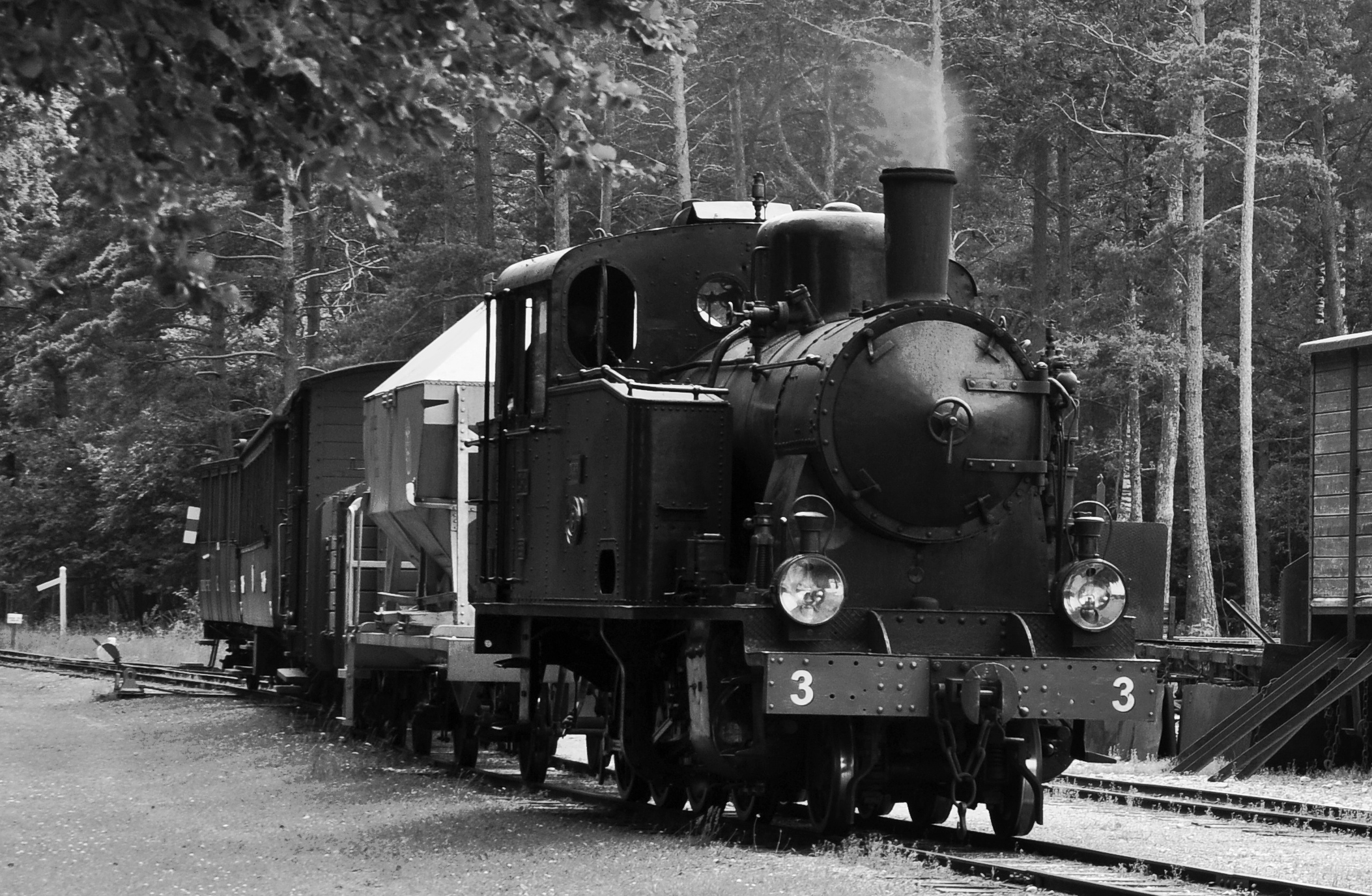
The Dalhem steam locomotive, SlRJ locomotive 3, from 1920

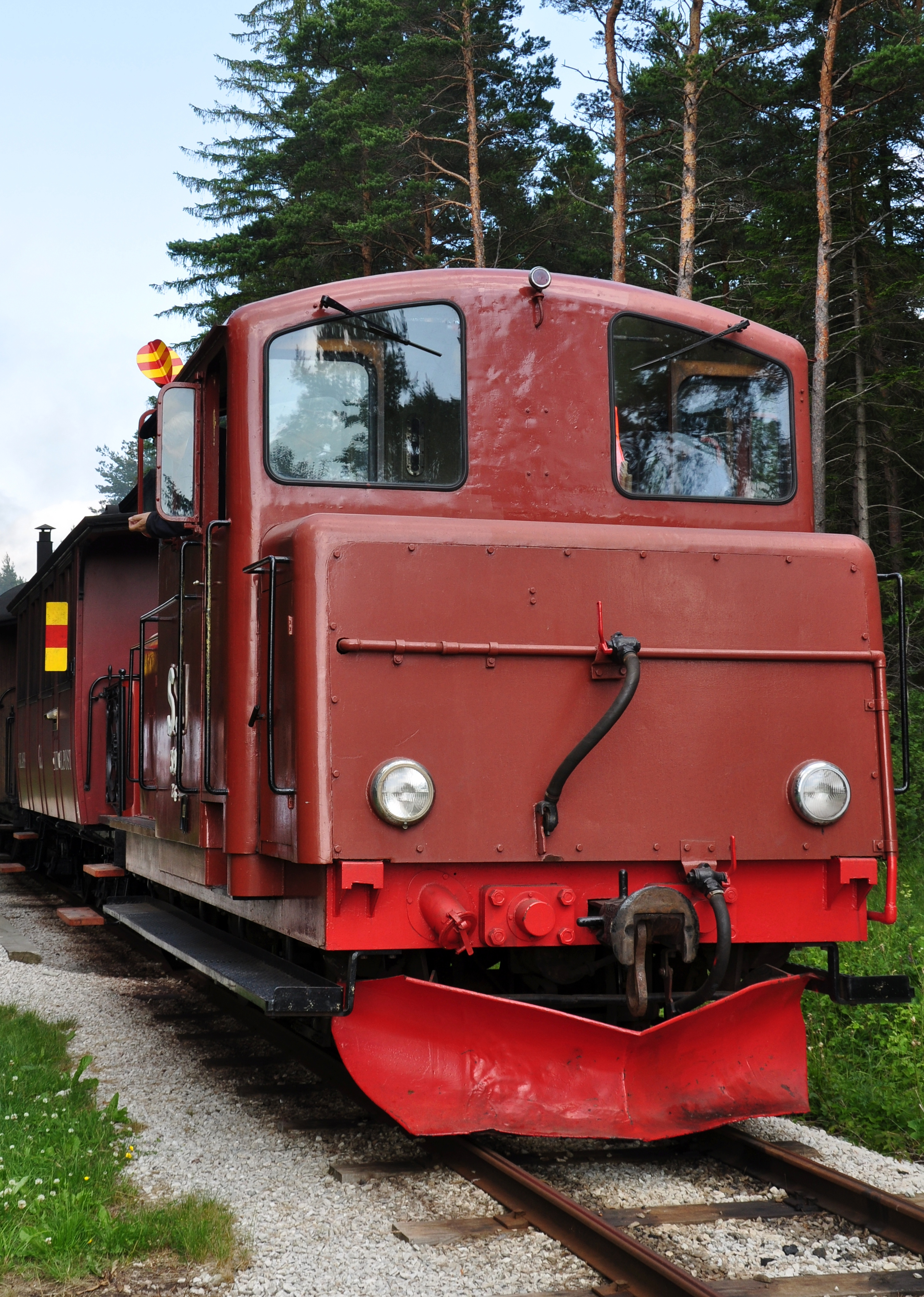
Locomotive SJ Z4p (one of three that the museum owns)

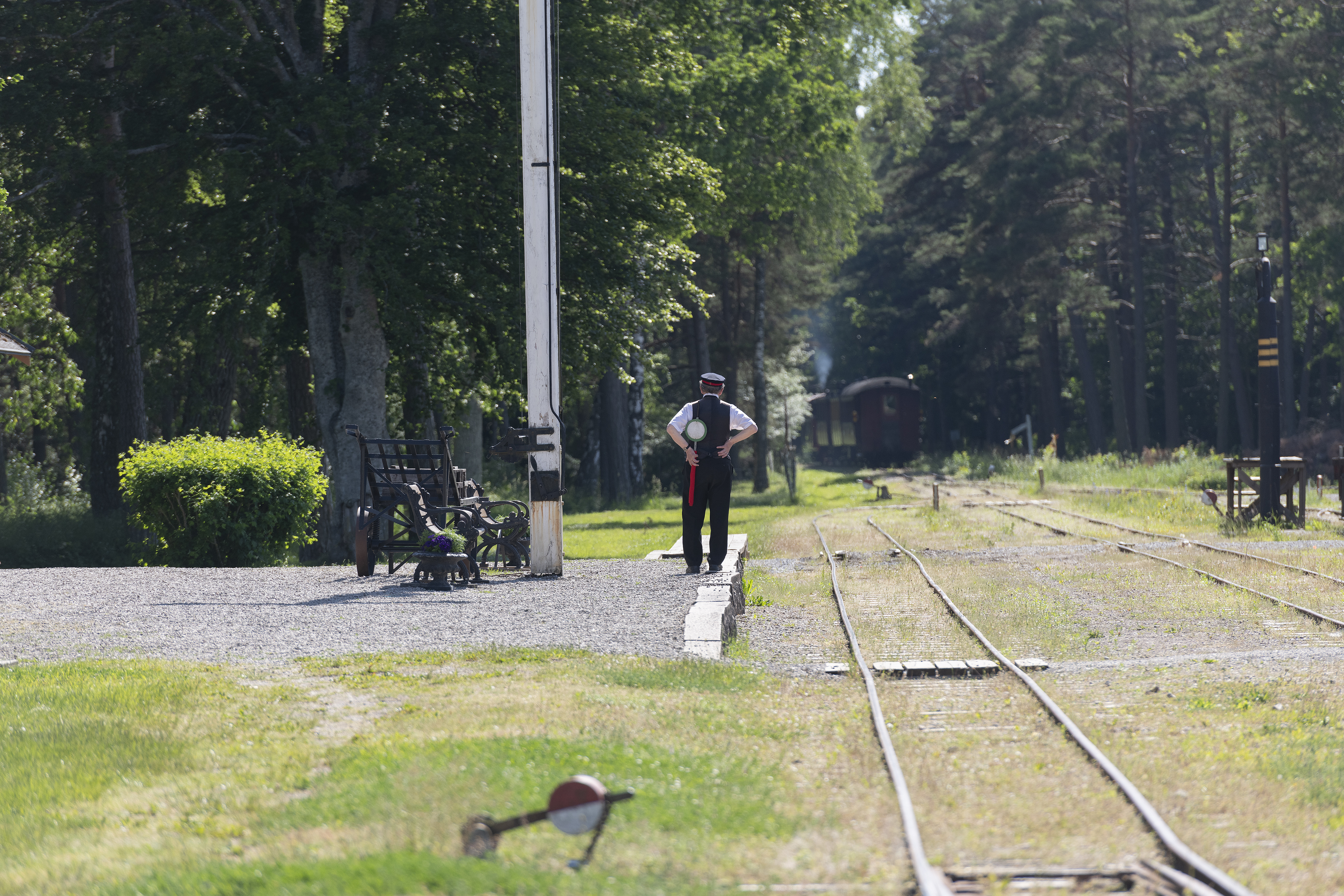

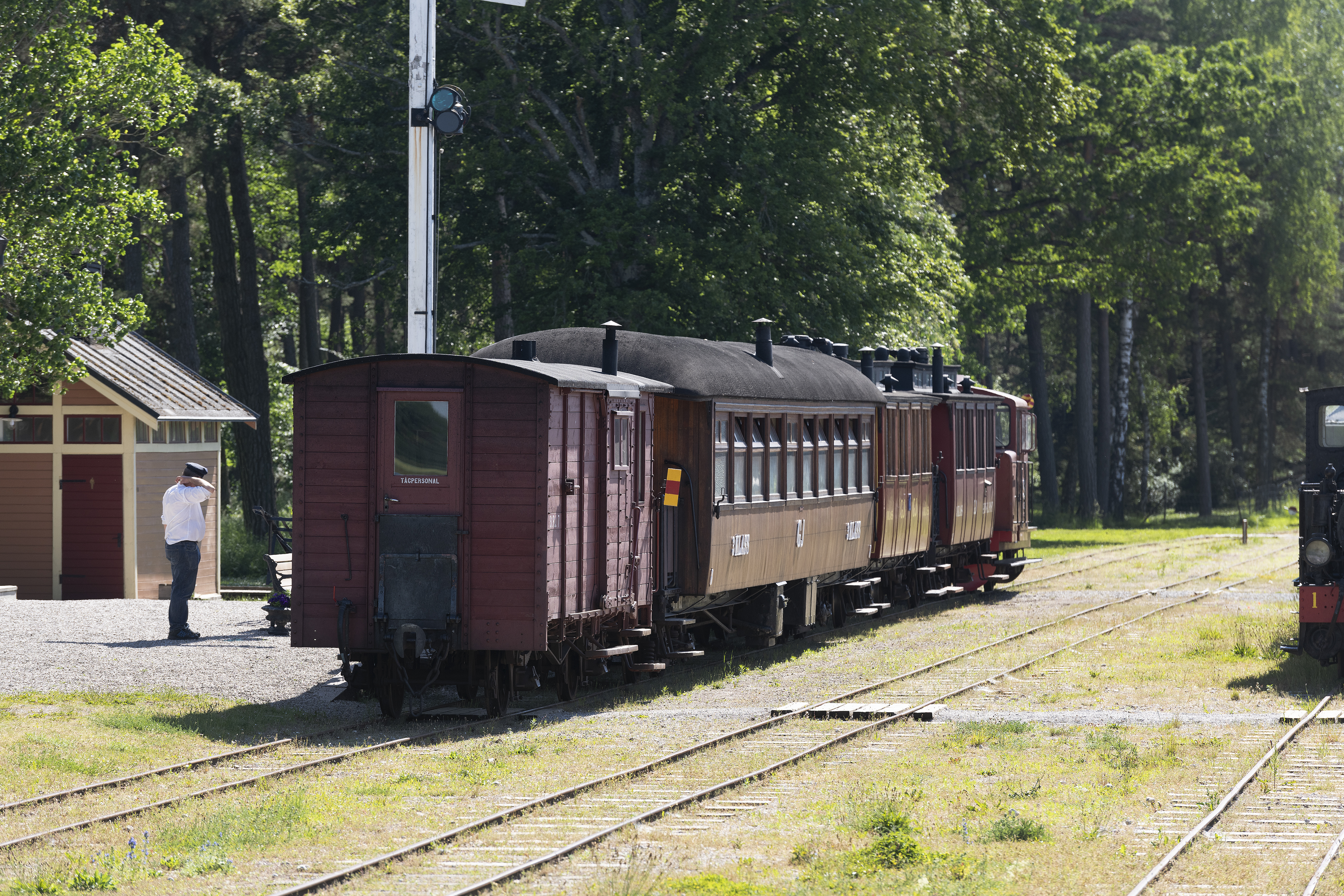

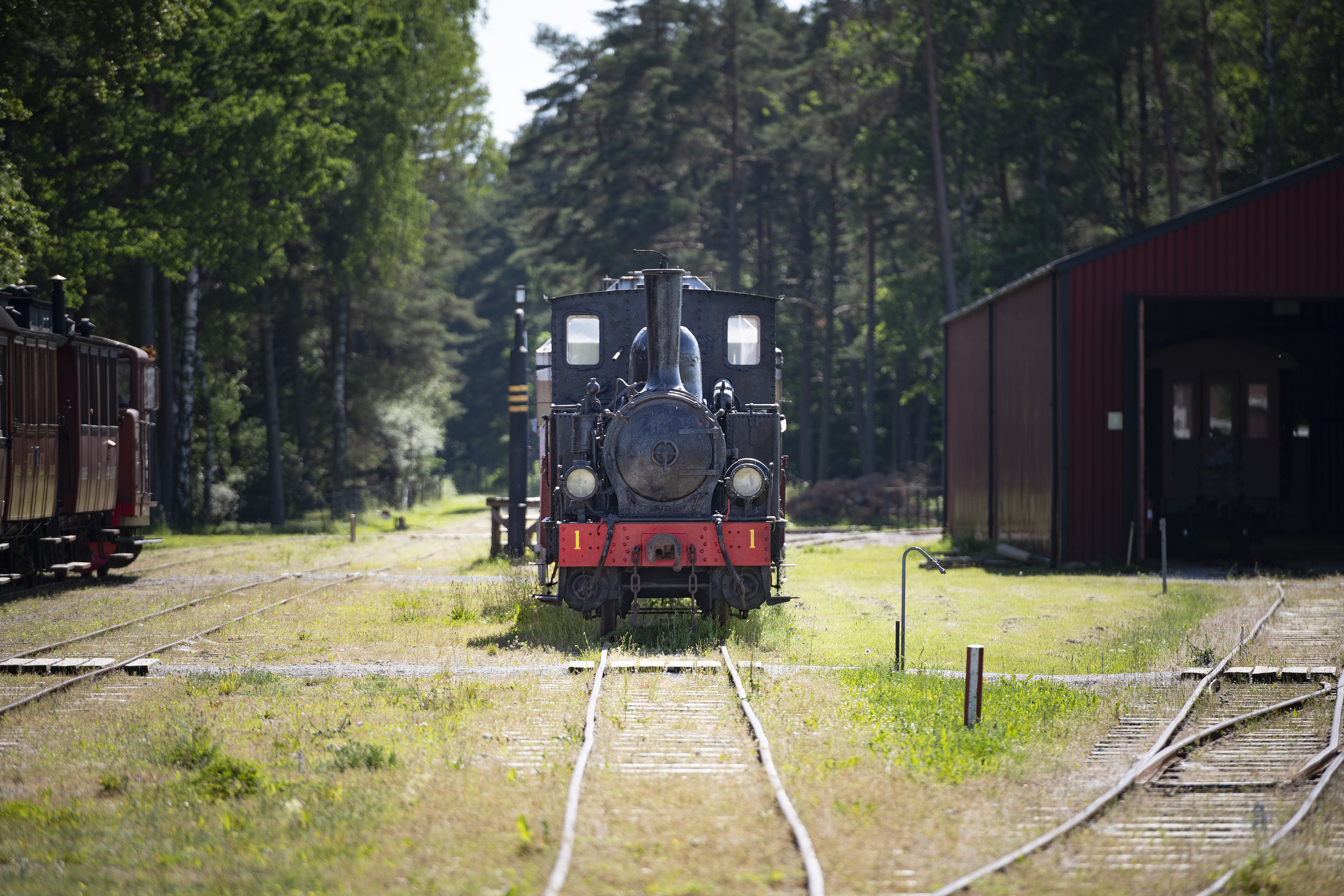

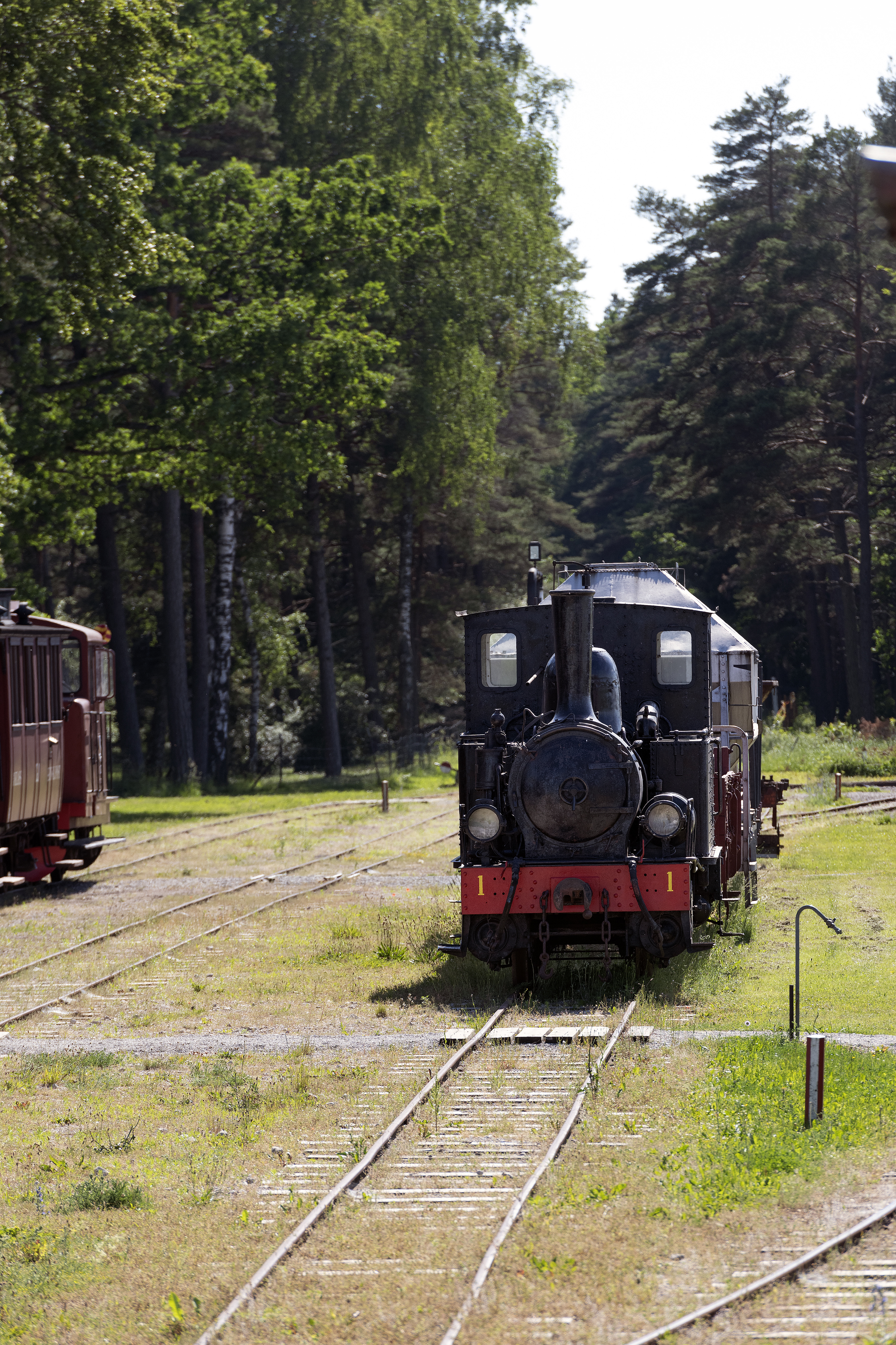
