= Colic weed =

Colic weed is a common name for several plants and may refer to:

- Aletris spp.
- Corydalis flavula, native to the eastern United States
- Dicentra spp.
