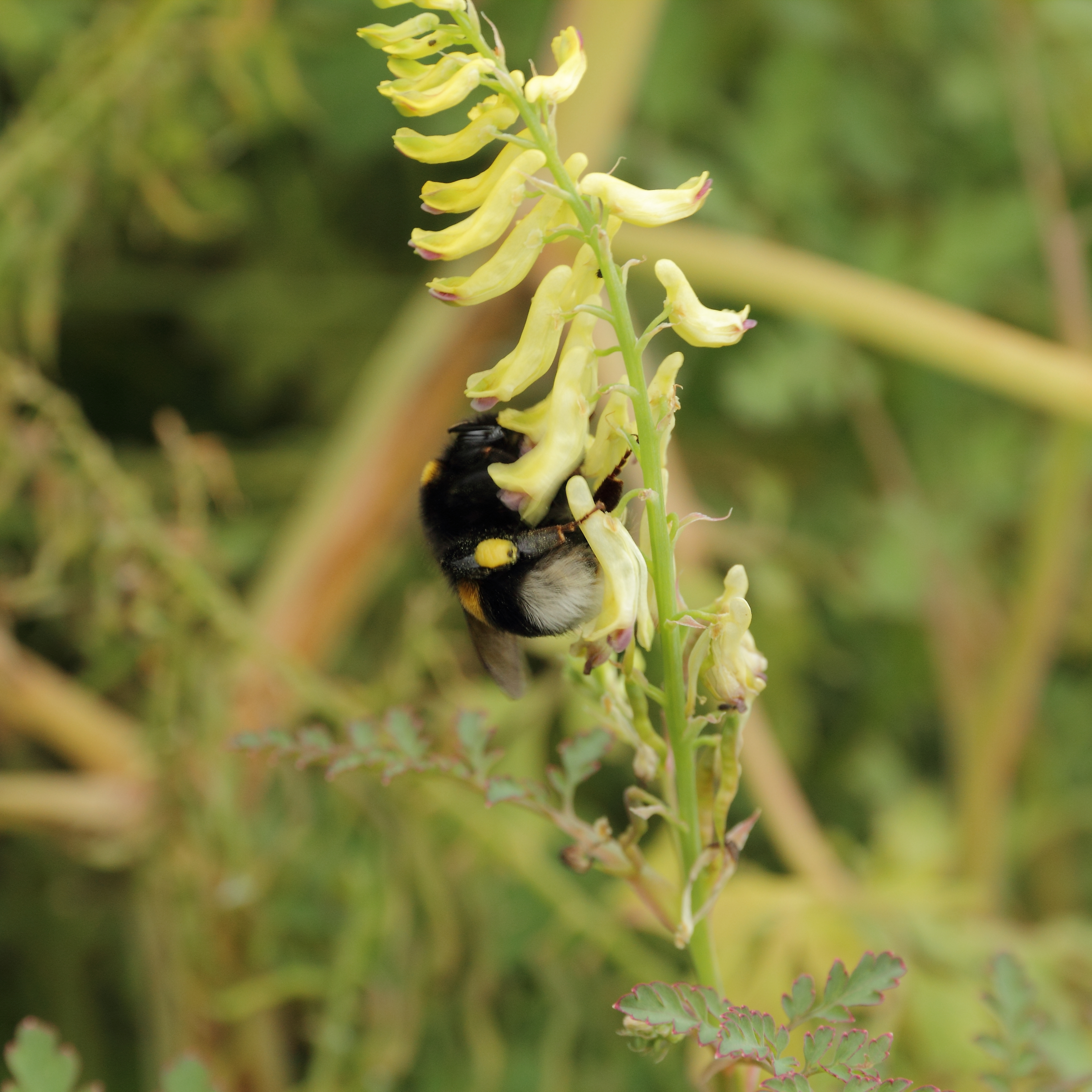

Scientific classification
- Kingdom: Plantae
- Clade: Tracheophytes
- Clade: Angiosperms
- Clade: Eudicots
- Order: Ranunculales
- Family: Papaveraceae
- Genus: Corydalis
- Species: C. chelidoniifolia

Binomial name
- Corydalis chelidoniifolia H.Lév. & Vaniot.

= Corydalis chelidoniifolia =

Species of flowering plant in the poppy family

Corydalis chelidoniifolia is a flowering plant in the poppy family Papaveraceae.

Many of the species in Corydalis contain other toxins and alkaloids like canadine, which blocks calcium.
