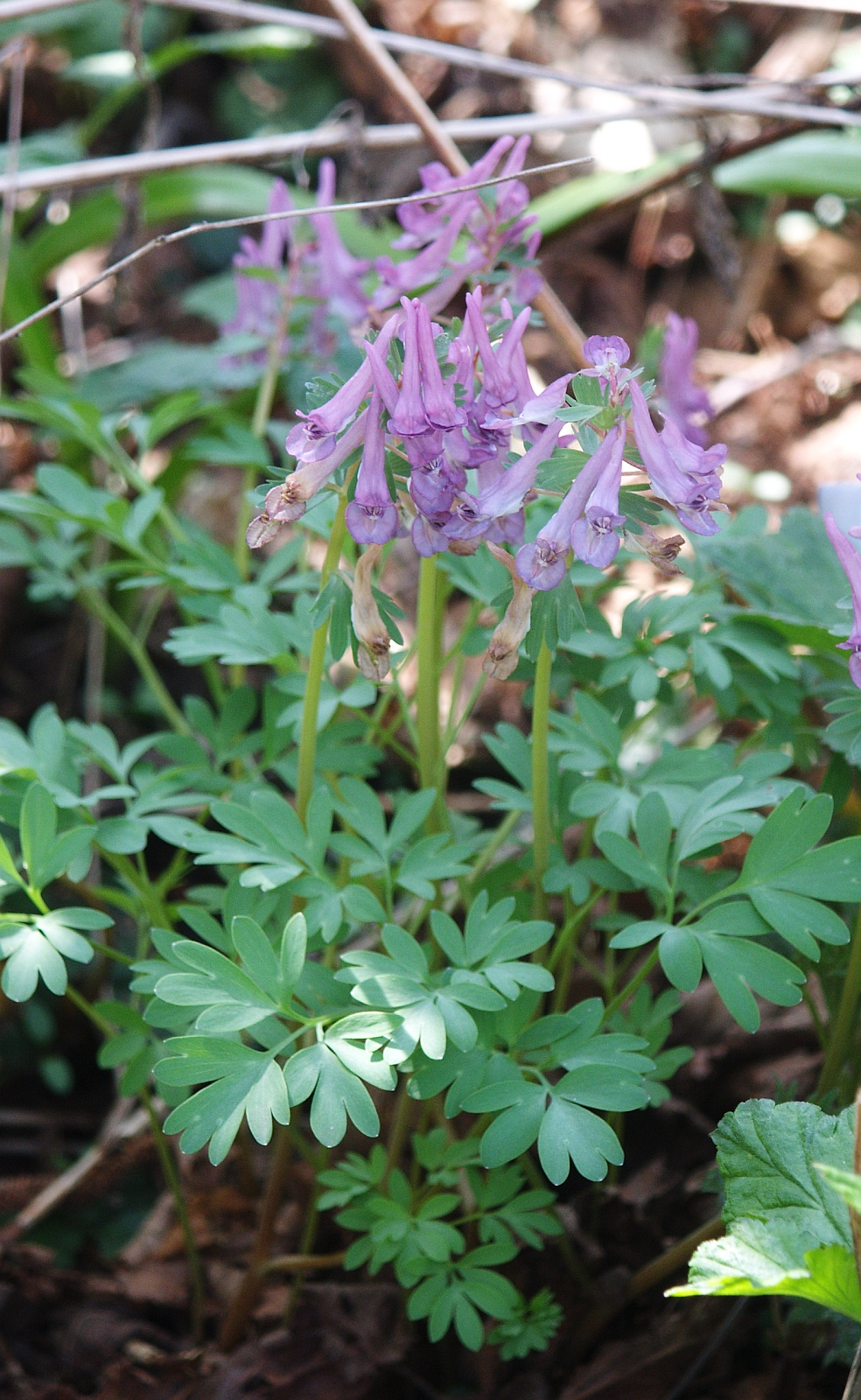

Scientific classification
- Kingdom: Plantae
- Clade: Tracheophytes
- Clade: Angiosperms
- Clade: Eudicots
- Order: Ranunculales
- Family: Papaveraceae
- Genus: Corydalis
- Species: C. solida

Binomial name
- Corydalis solida (L.) Clairv.

Synonyms
- Corydalis halleri (Willd.) Willd.

= Corydalis solida =

Species of flowering plant in the poppy family

Corydalis solida, fumewort or bird-in-a-bush, is a species of flowering plant in the family Papaveraceae, native to moist, shady habitats in northern Europe and Asia. Growing to 25 cm (10 in), it is a spring ephemeral, with foliage that appears in spring and dies down to its tuberous rootstock in summer. It is cultivated for its deeply divided, ferny leaves and narrow, long-spurred flowers which appear in spring. The flowers show color variation, and may be mauve, purple, red, or white.

== Systematics ==
The species was originally named in 1753 by Linnaeus as the variety solida of his Fumaria bulbosa. It was raised to the species F. solida by Philip Miller in 1771. Its current assignment to the genus Corydalis was made by Joseph Philippe de Clairville in 1811.

Four subspecies are recognized:

- C. solida subsp. incisa Lidén
- C. solida subsp. longicarpa Lidén
- C. solida subsp. solida
- C. solida subsp. subremota Popov ex Lidén & Zetterlund

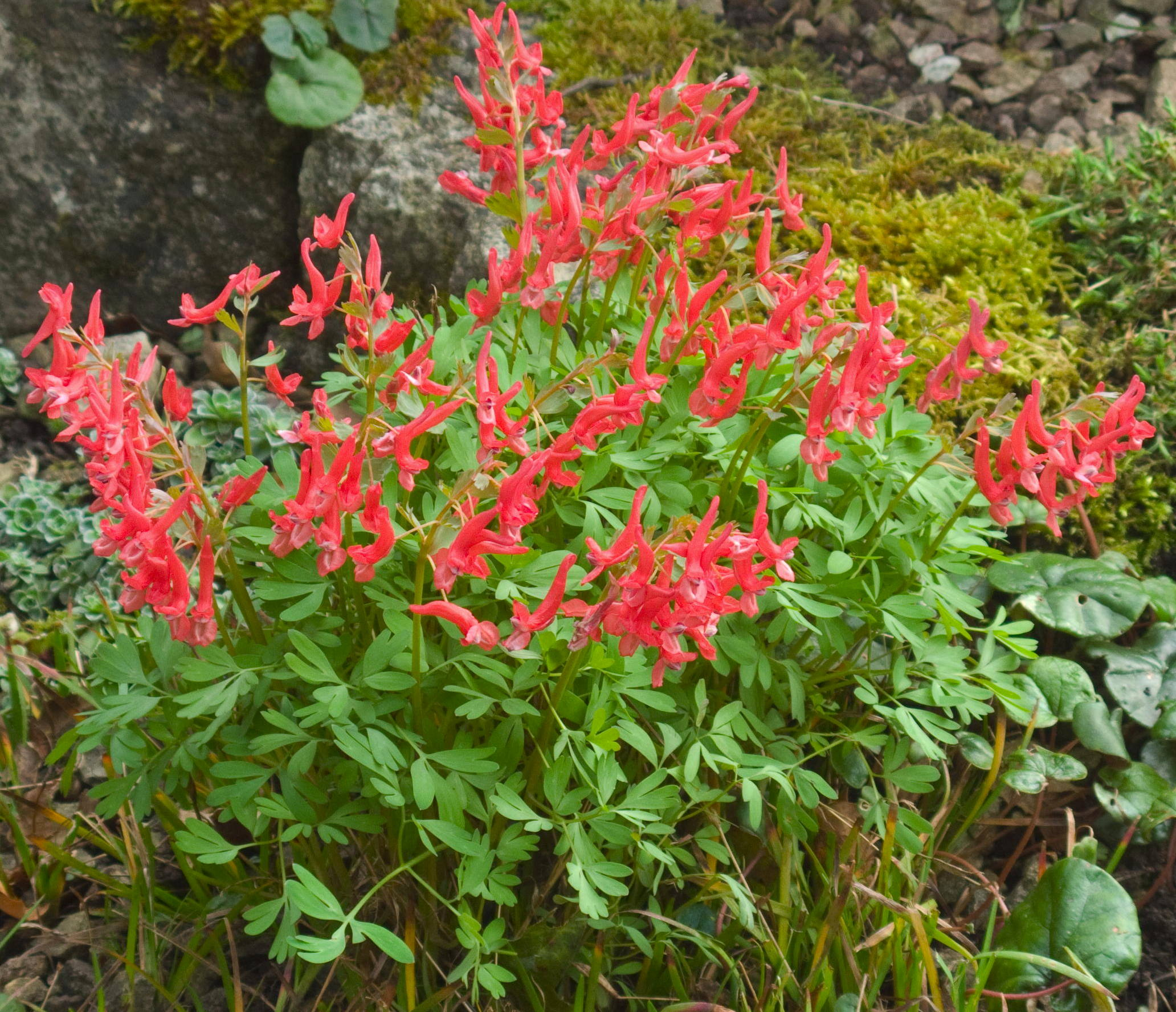
Corydalis solida 'George Baker'

- C. solida subsp. incisa (pale purple flowers) has gained the Royal Horticultural Society's Award of Garden Merit.
