= Fitweed (disambiguation) =

List of plants with the same or similar names

Fitweed is a common name of two species of plant:

- Corydalis caseana, a poisonous herb from the western United States in the poppy family
- Eryngium foetidum, a tropical perennial herb in the parsley family used in cuisine worldwide
