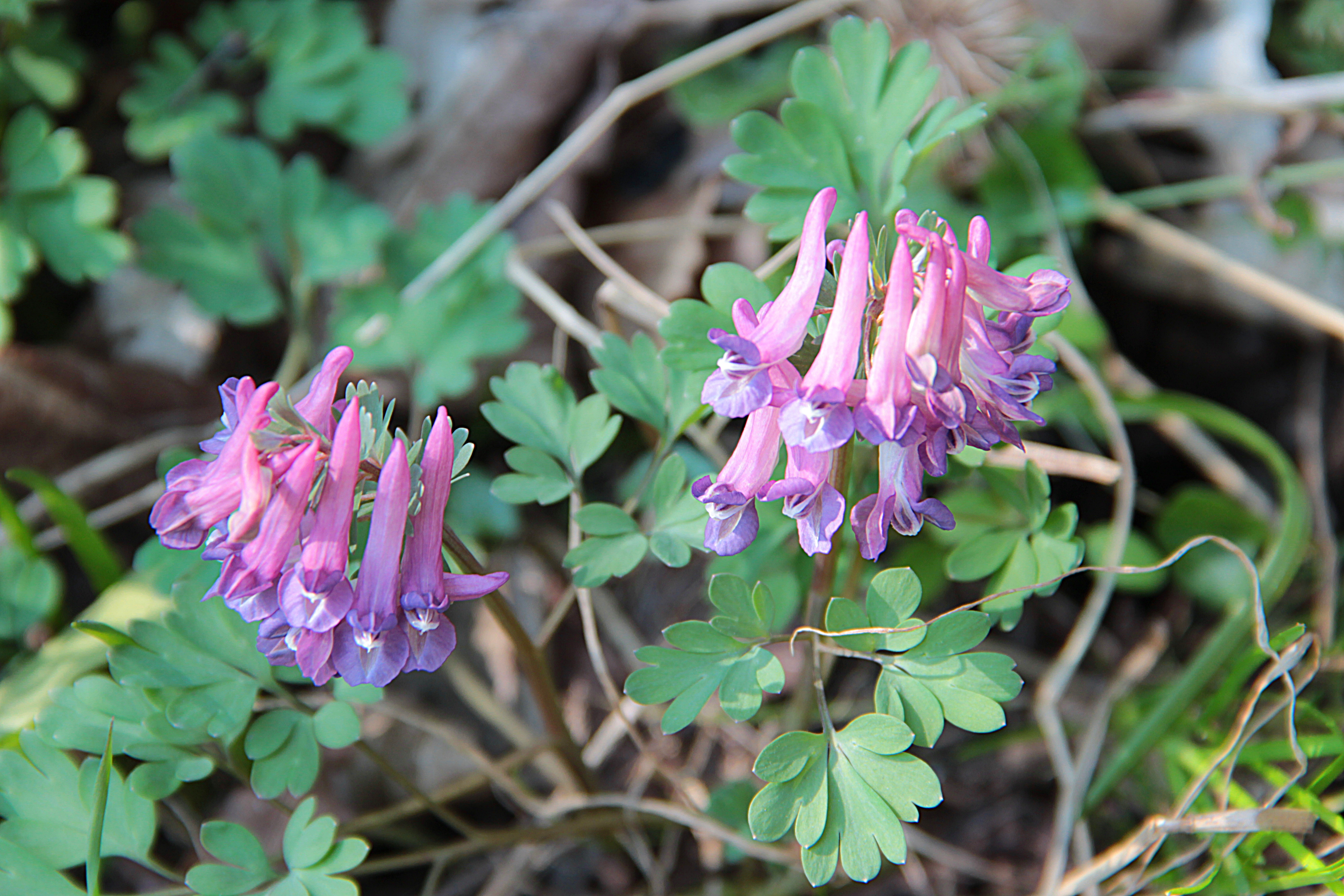
- Corydalis solida

Scientific classification
- Kingdom: Plantae
- Clade: Embryophytes
- Clade: Tracheophytes
- Clade: Angiosperms
- Clade: Eudicots
- Order: Ranunculales
- Family: Papaveraceae
- Subfamily: Fumarioideae
- Tribe: Fumarieae
- Subtribe: Corydalinae
- Genus: Corydalis; DC.

Type species
- Corydalis bulbosa (L.) DC.

= Corydalis =

Genus of flowering plants in the poppy family

Corydalis (from Greek korydalís "crested lark") is a genus of about 540 species of annual and perennial herbaceous plants in the family Papaveraceae, native to the temperate Northern Hemisphere and the high mountains of tropical eastern Africa. They are most diverse in China and the Himalayas, with at least 357 species in China. Corydalis species are the only dicots having only a single cotyledon (seed leaf).

== Ecology ==
Corydalis species are used as food plants by the larva of some Lepidoptera species (butterflies), especially the clouded Apollo.

== Toxicity ==
Corydalis cava and some other tuberous species contain the alkaloid bulbocapnine, which is occasionally used in medicine but scientific evidence is lacking in the correct dosages and side effects.

Many of the species in Corydalis contain other toxins and alkaloids like canadine, which blocks calcium. The species C. caseana is poisonous to livestock.

== Taxonomy ==
=== Current species ===
There are about 540 species, including:

- Corydalis ambigua
- Corydalis aurea
- Corydalis buschii
- Corydalis bracteata
- Corydalis cava
- Corydalis caseana
- Corydalis cheilanthifolia – ferny corydalis
- Corydalis chelidoniifolia
- Corydalis darwasica
- Corydalis elegans
- Corydalis filistipes
- Corydalis flavula
- Corydalis flexuosa
- Corydalis heterocarpa
- Corydalis incisa
- Corydalis integra
- Corydalis linstowiana
- Corydalis micrantha
- Corydalis nobilis
- Corydalis ochotensis
- Corydalis omeiana
- Corydalis orthoceras
- Corydalis palaestina
- Corydalis pallida
- Corydalis pauciflora
- Corydalis pauciovulata
- Corydalis rutifolia
- Corydalis saxicola
- Corydalis scouleri
- Corydalis solida – fumewort
- Corydalis vittae
- Corydalis wilsonii
- Corydalis yanhusuo
Photos of Corydalis species listed above

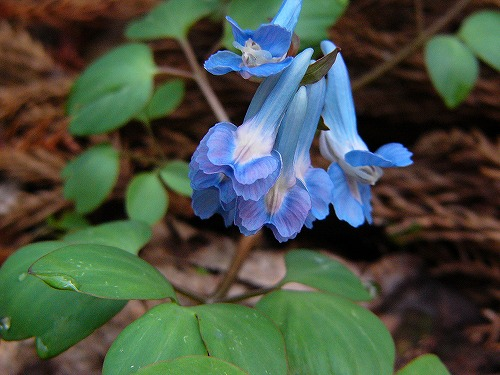
Corydalis ambigua

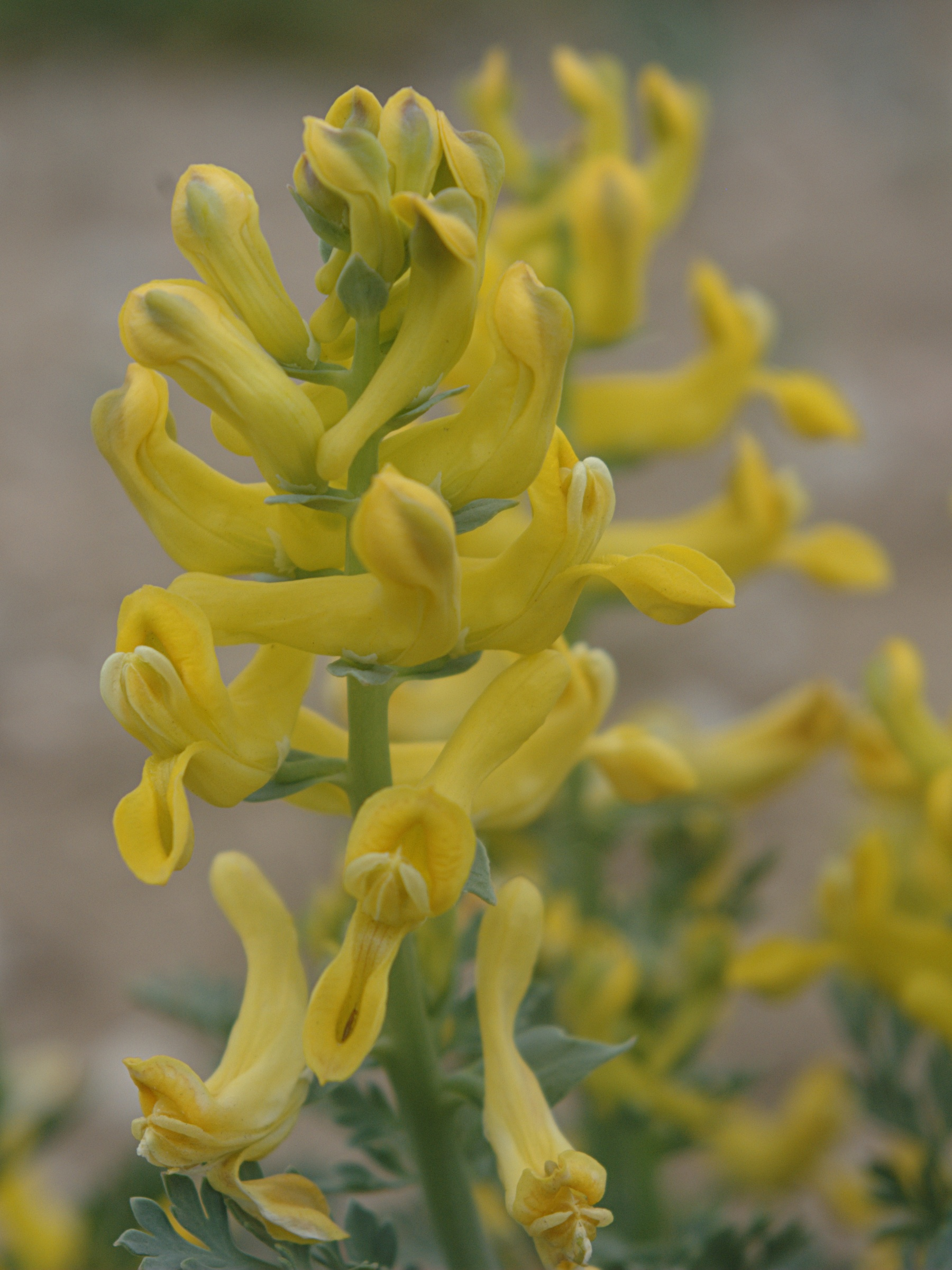
Golden smoke (Corydalis aurea)

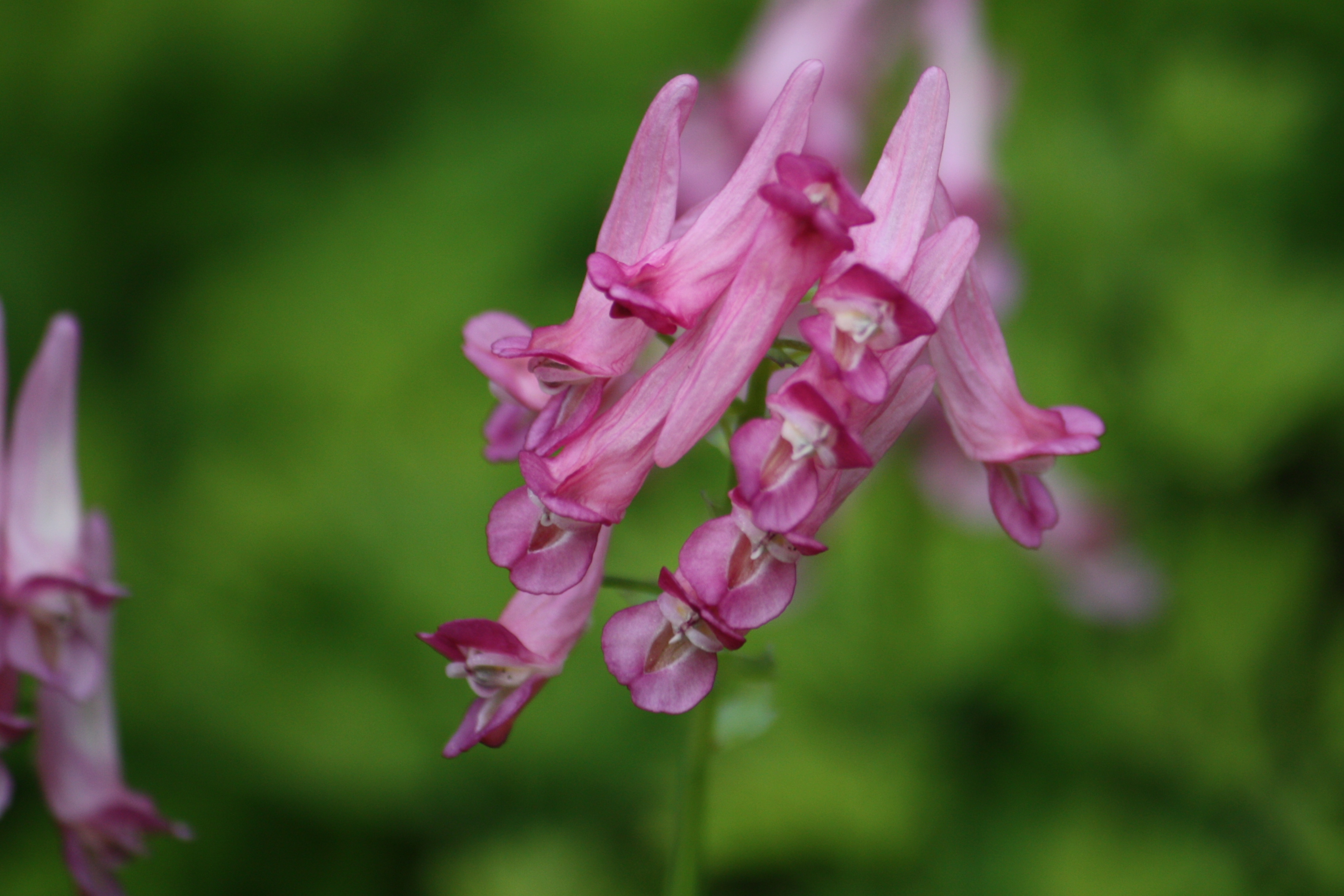
Corydalis buschii

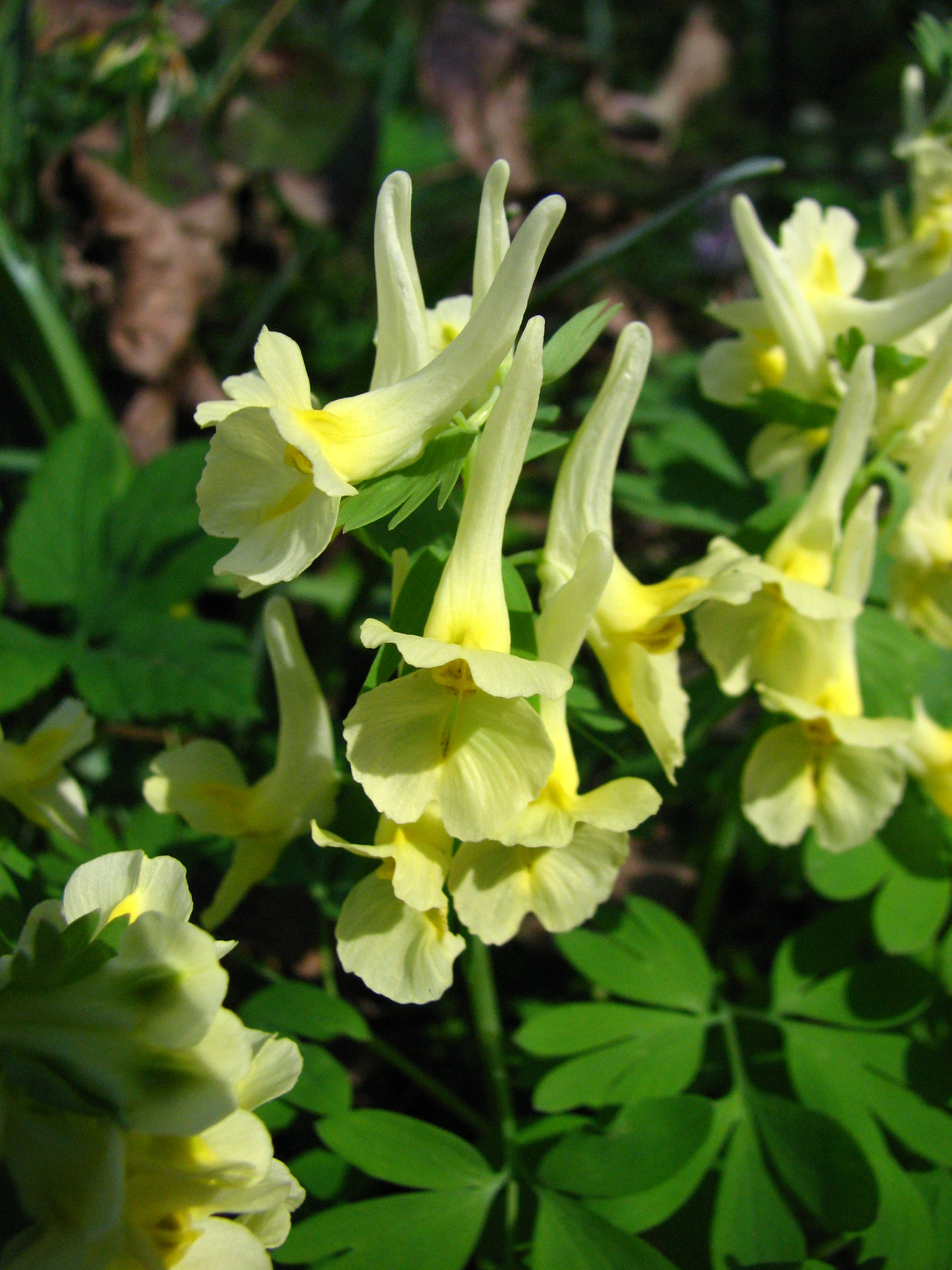
Corydalis bracteata

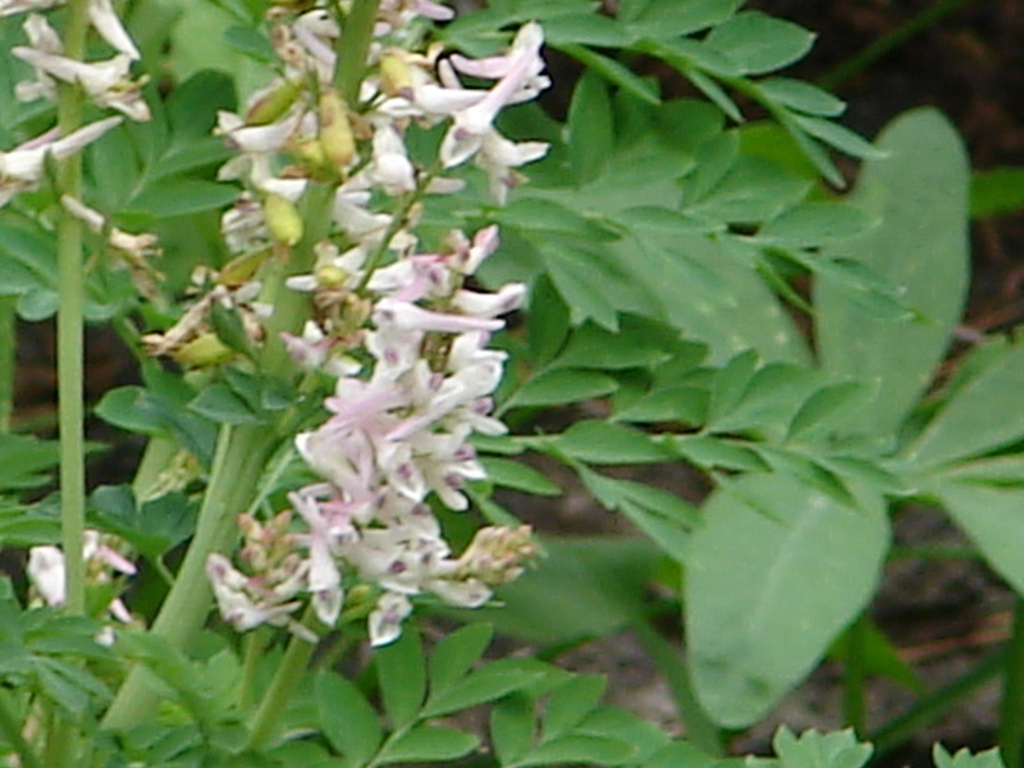
Corydalis caseana

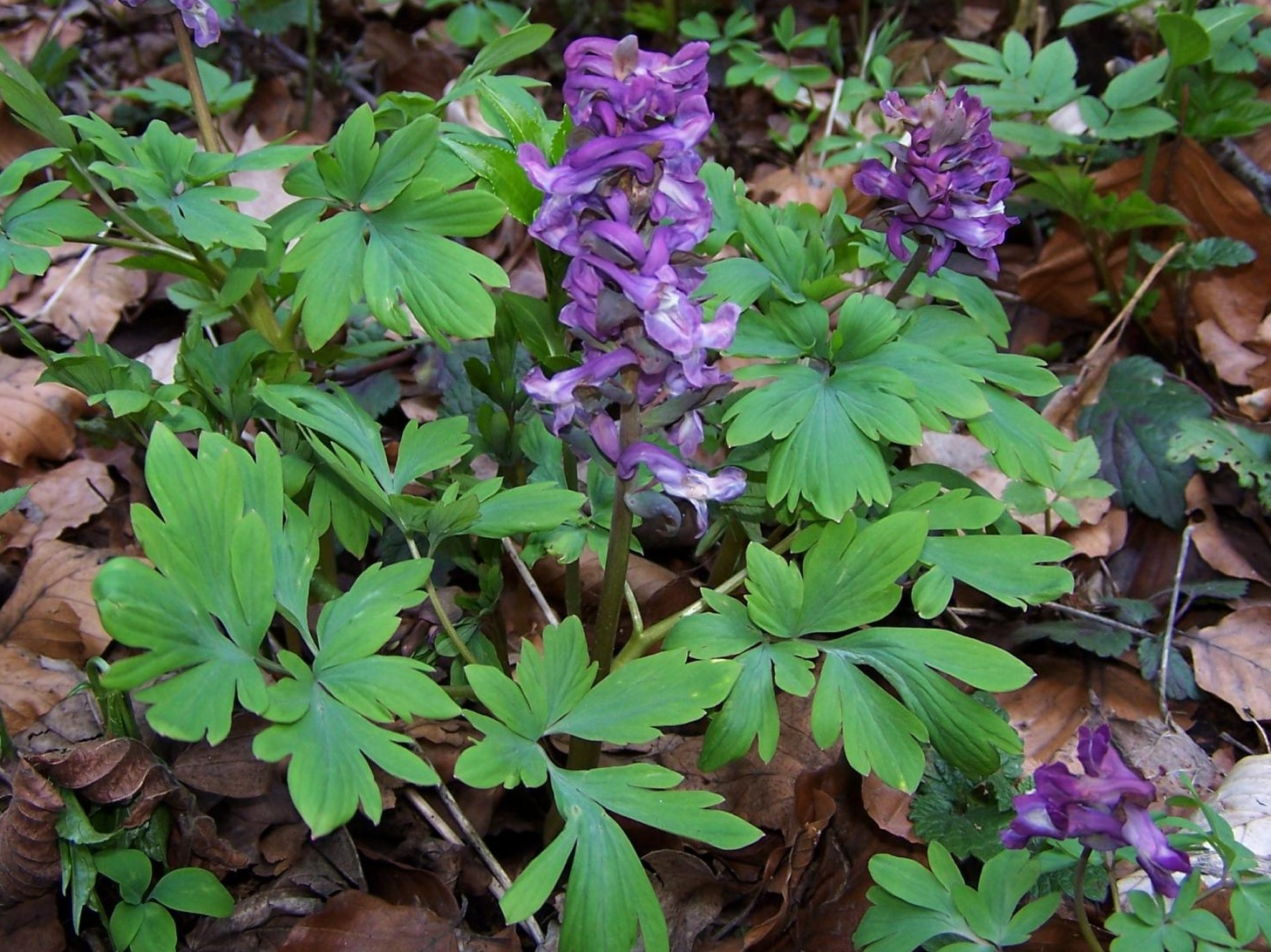
Corydalis cava

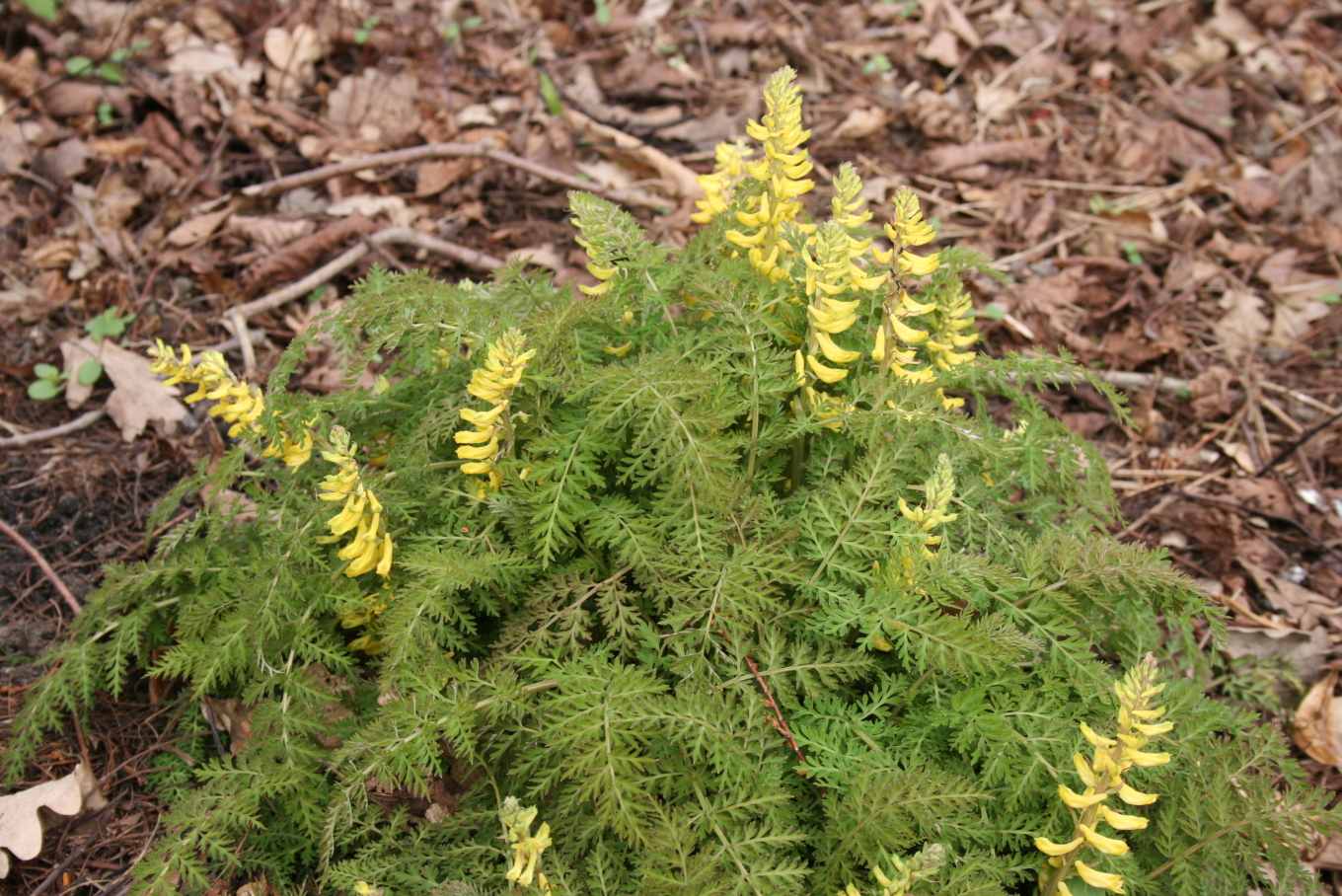
Ferny corydalis (Corydalis cheilanthifolia)

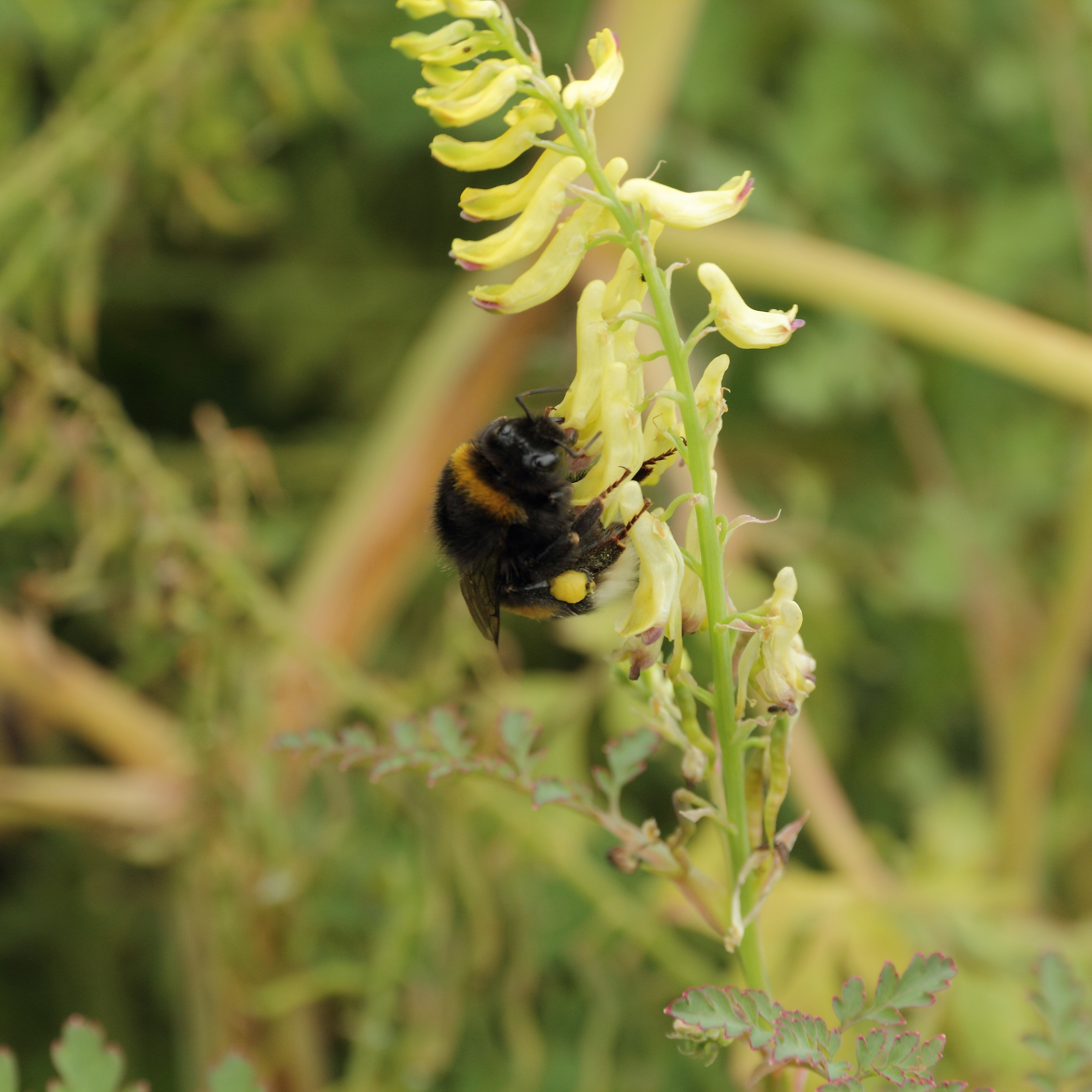
Corydalis chelidoniifolia

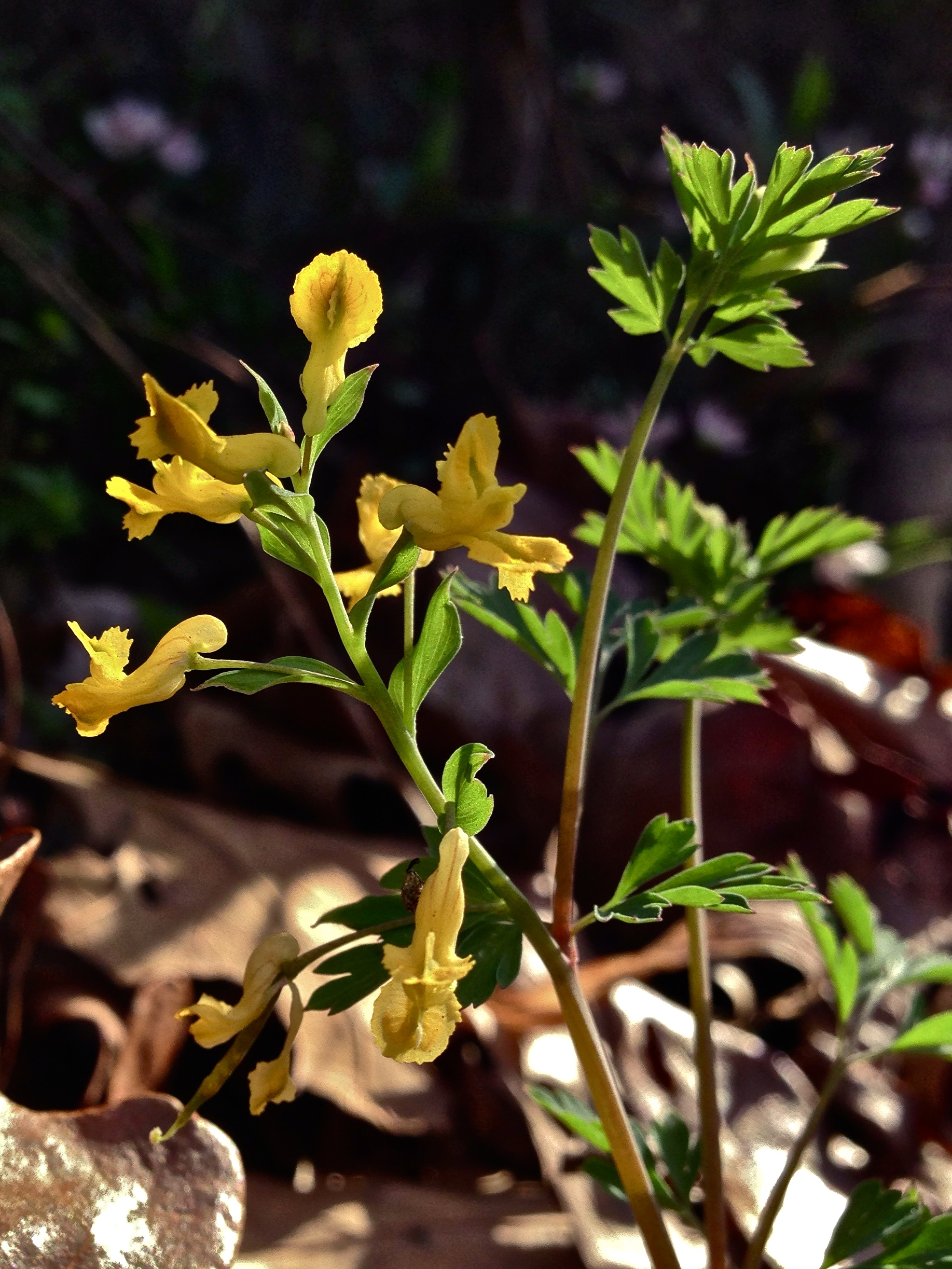
Corydalis flavula

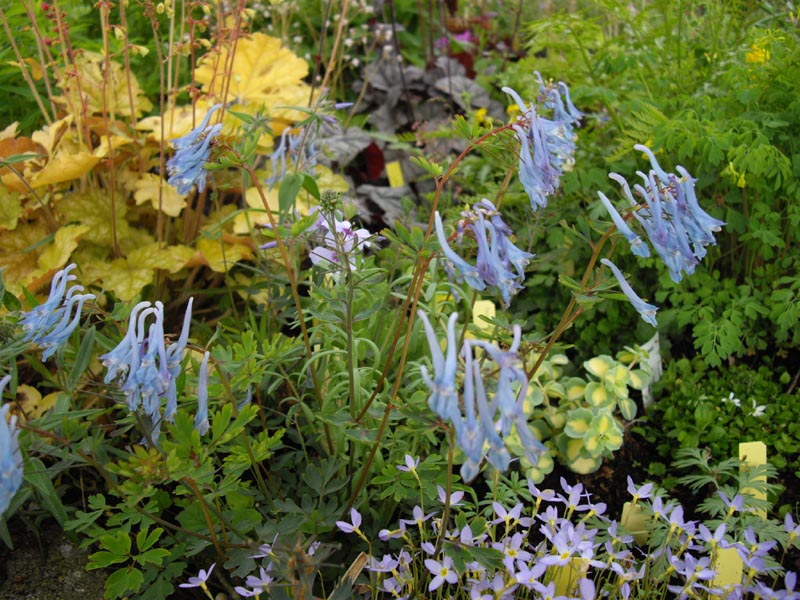
Corydalis flexuosa

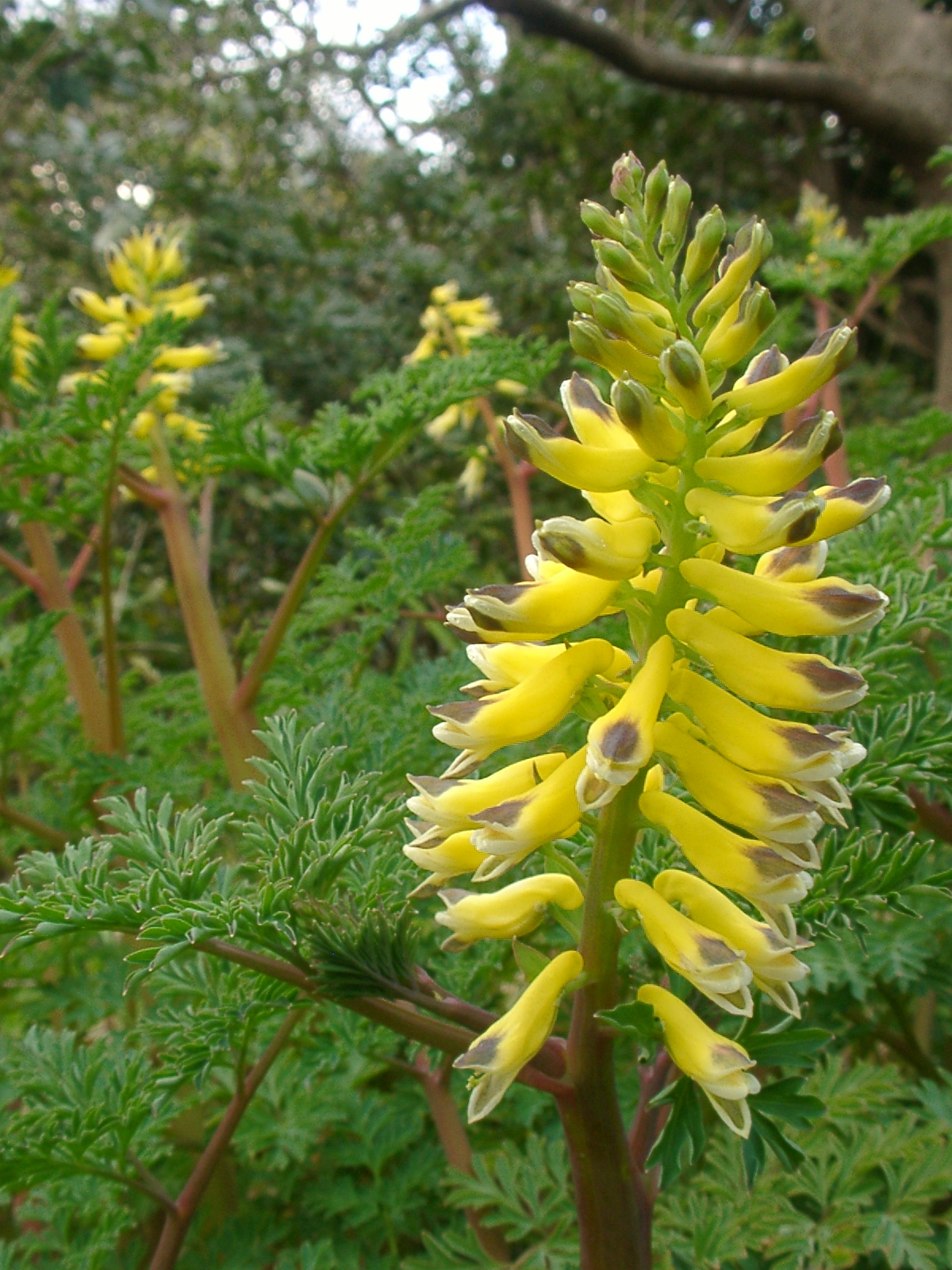
Corydalis heterocarpa

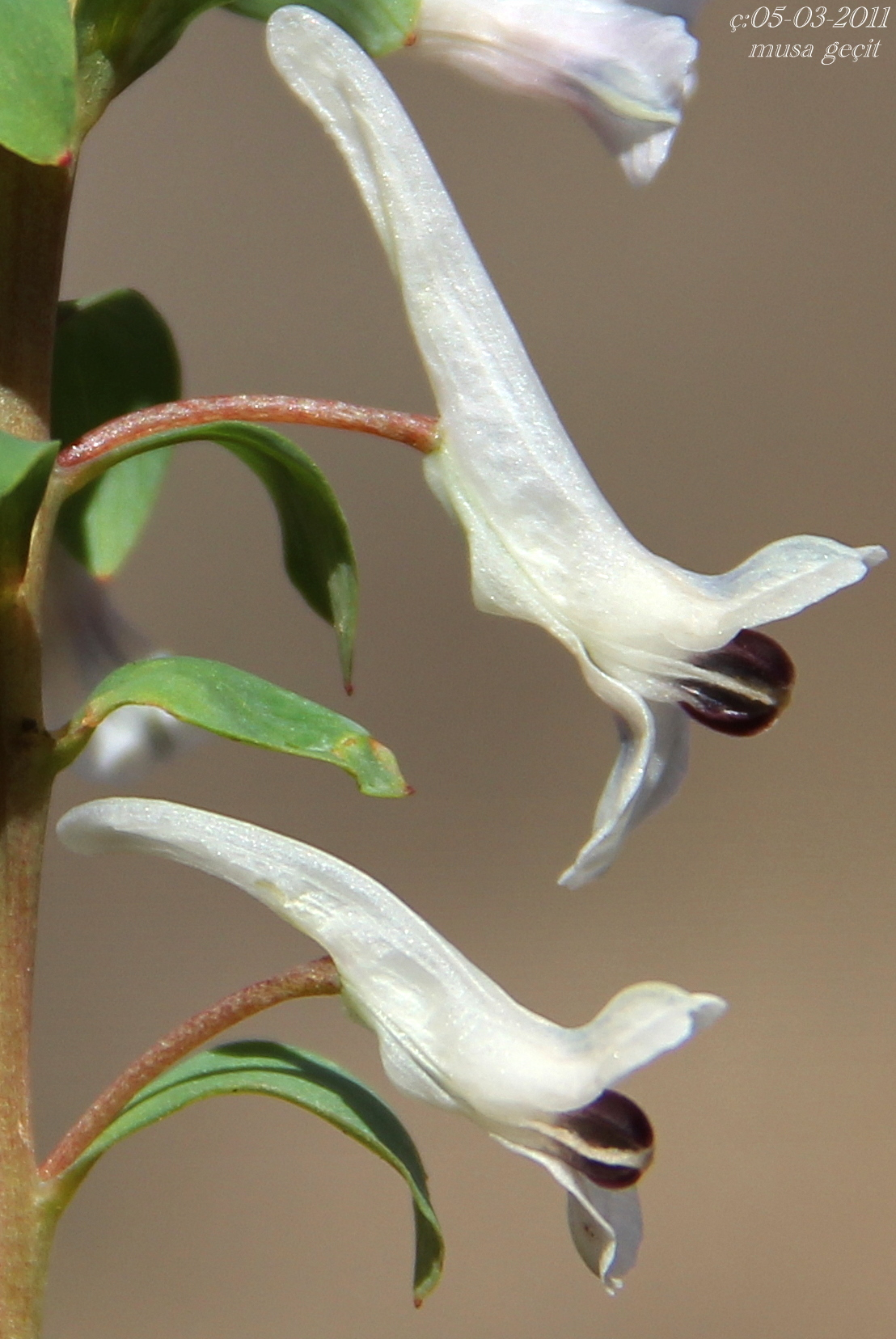
Corydalis integra

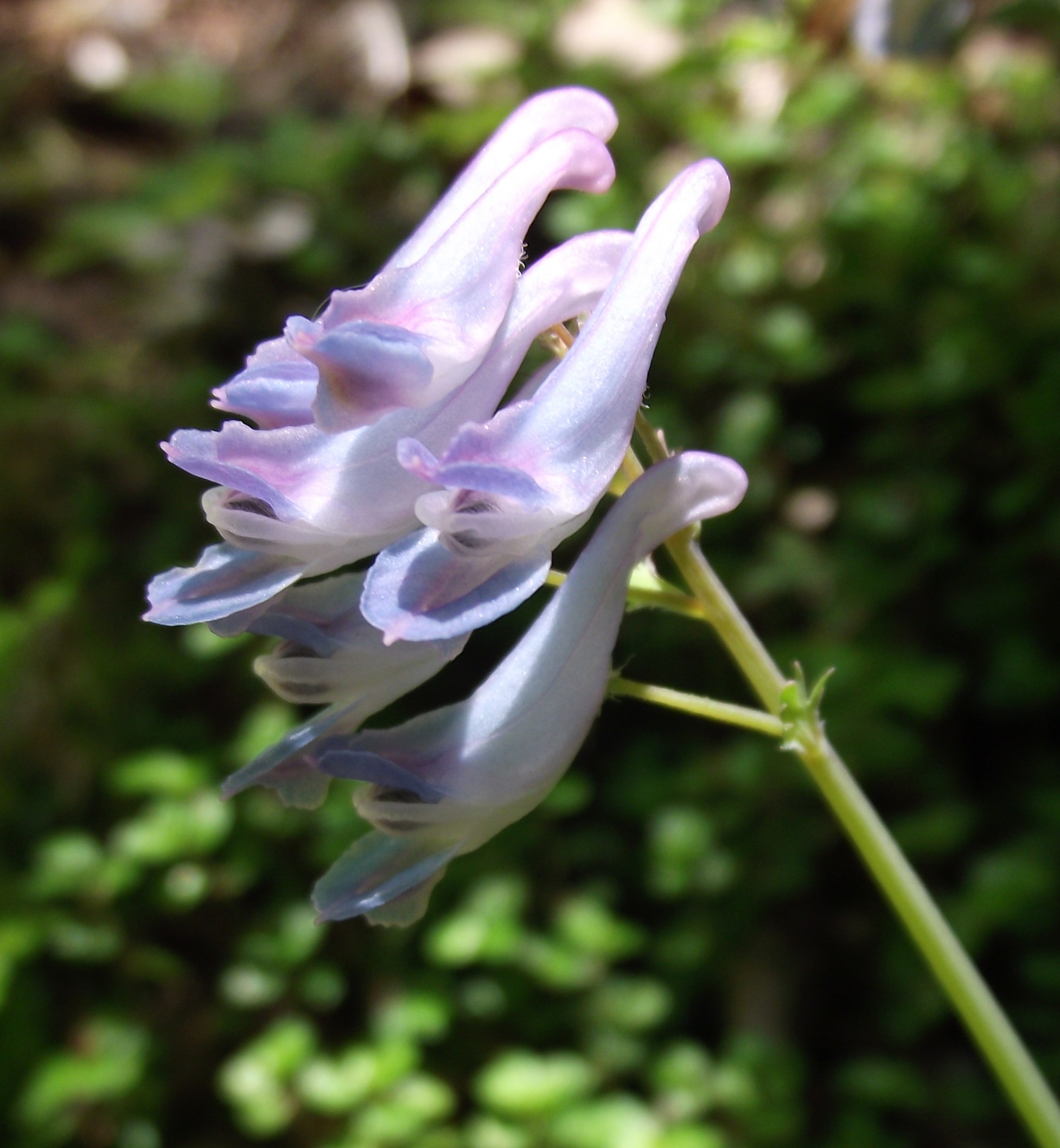
Corydalis linstowiana

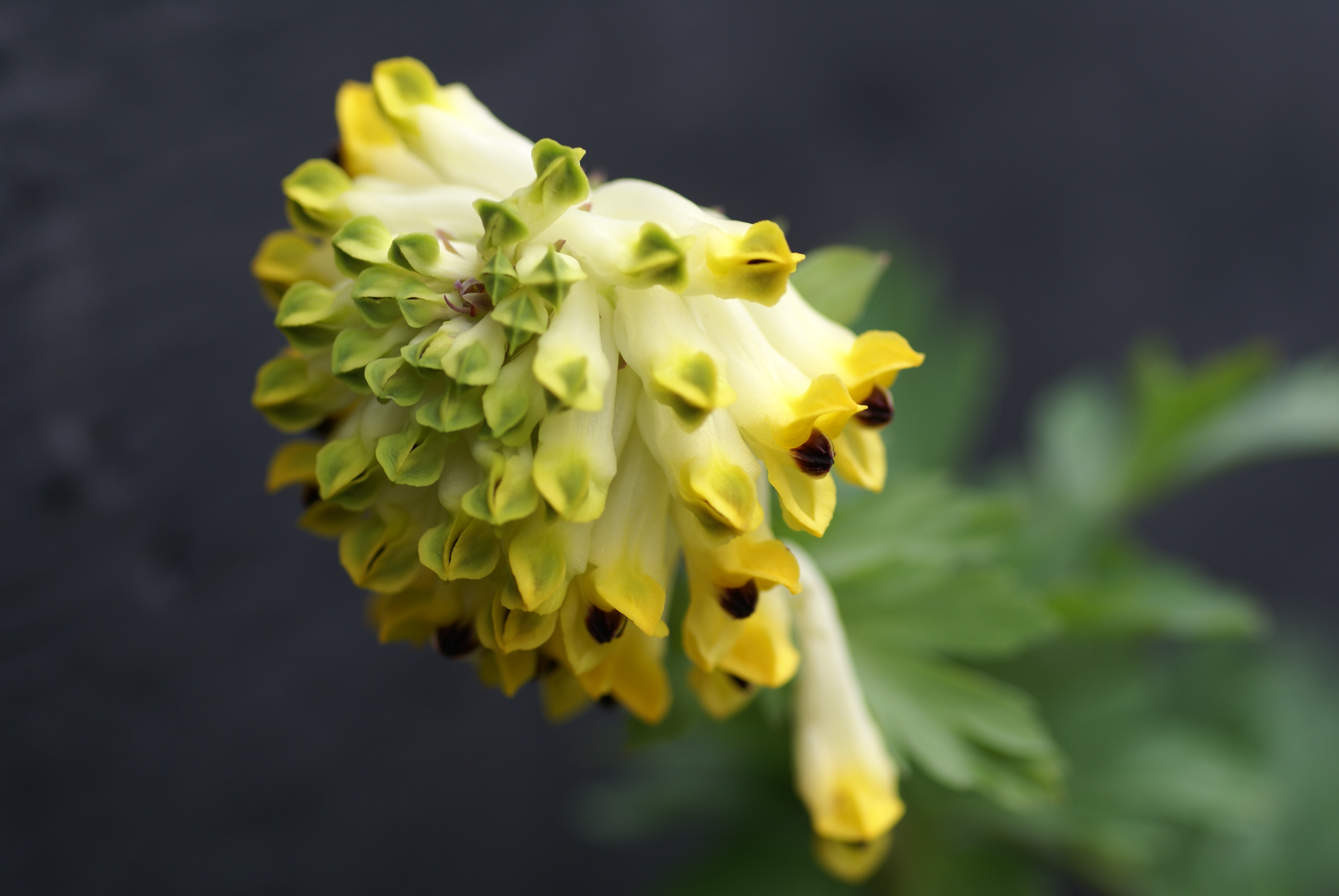
Corydalis nobilis

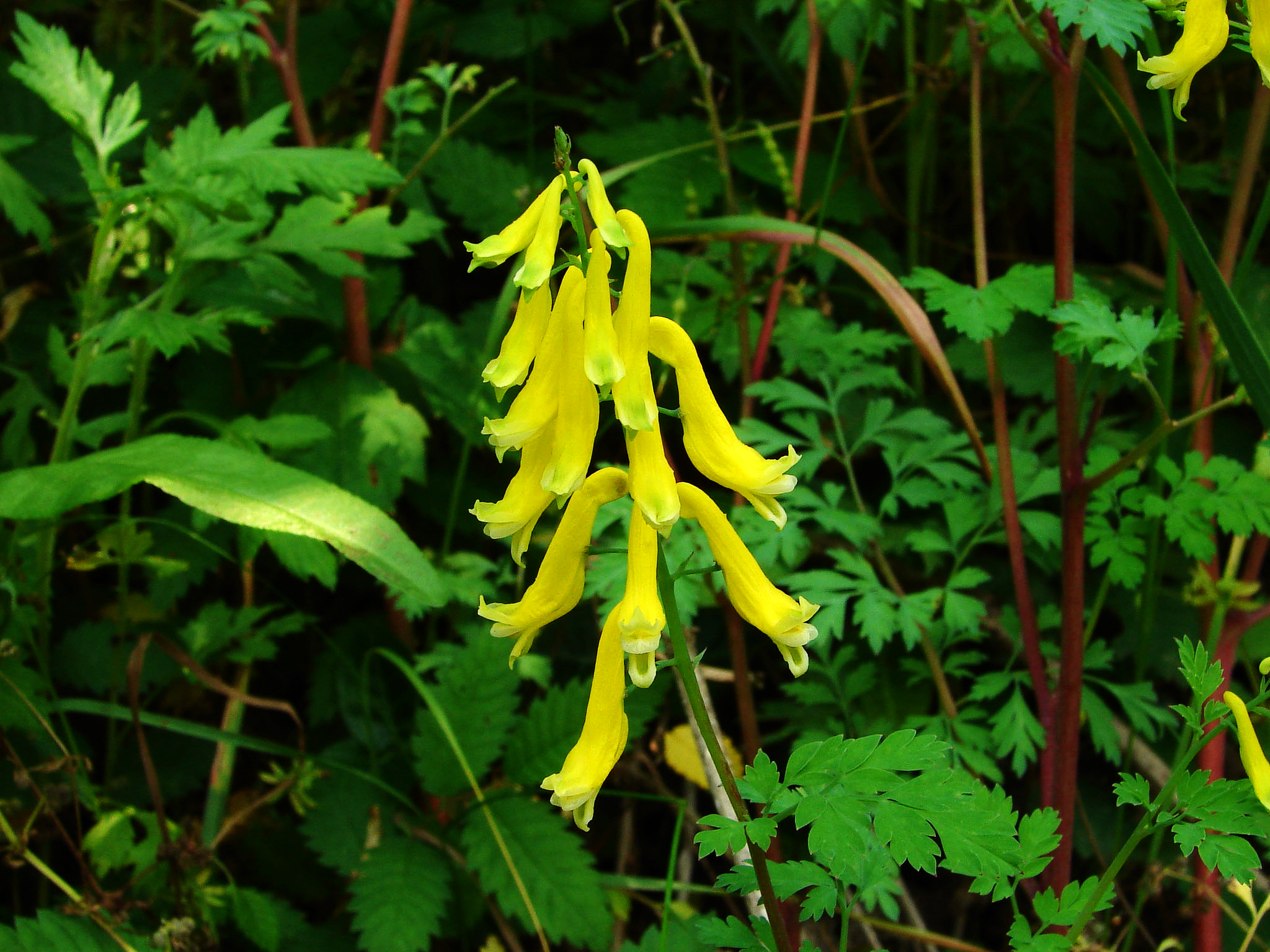
Corydalis ochotensis

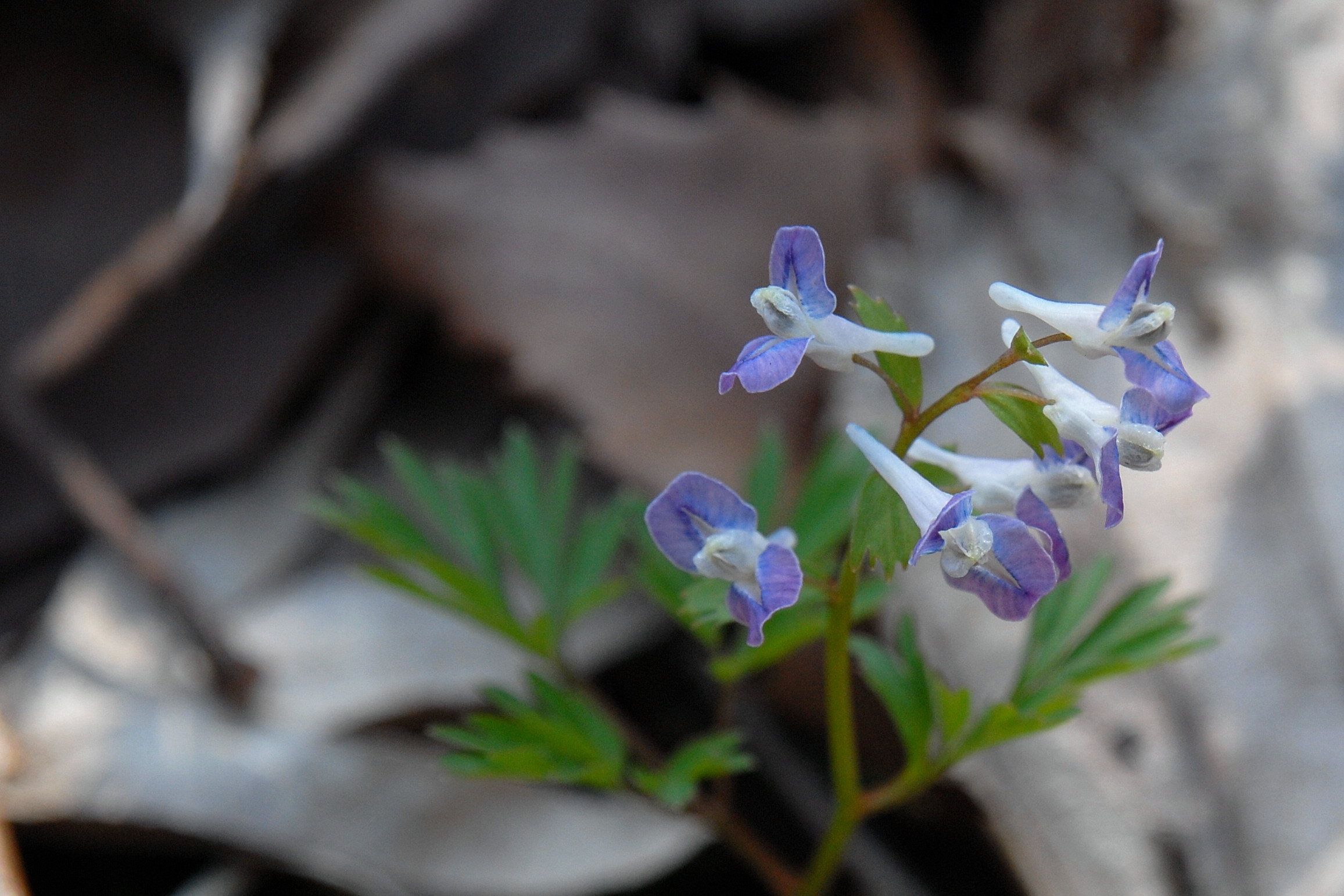
Corydalis orthoceras

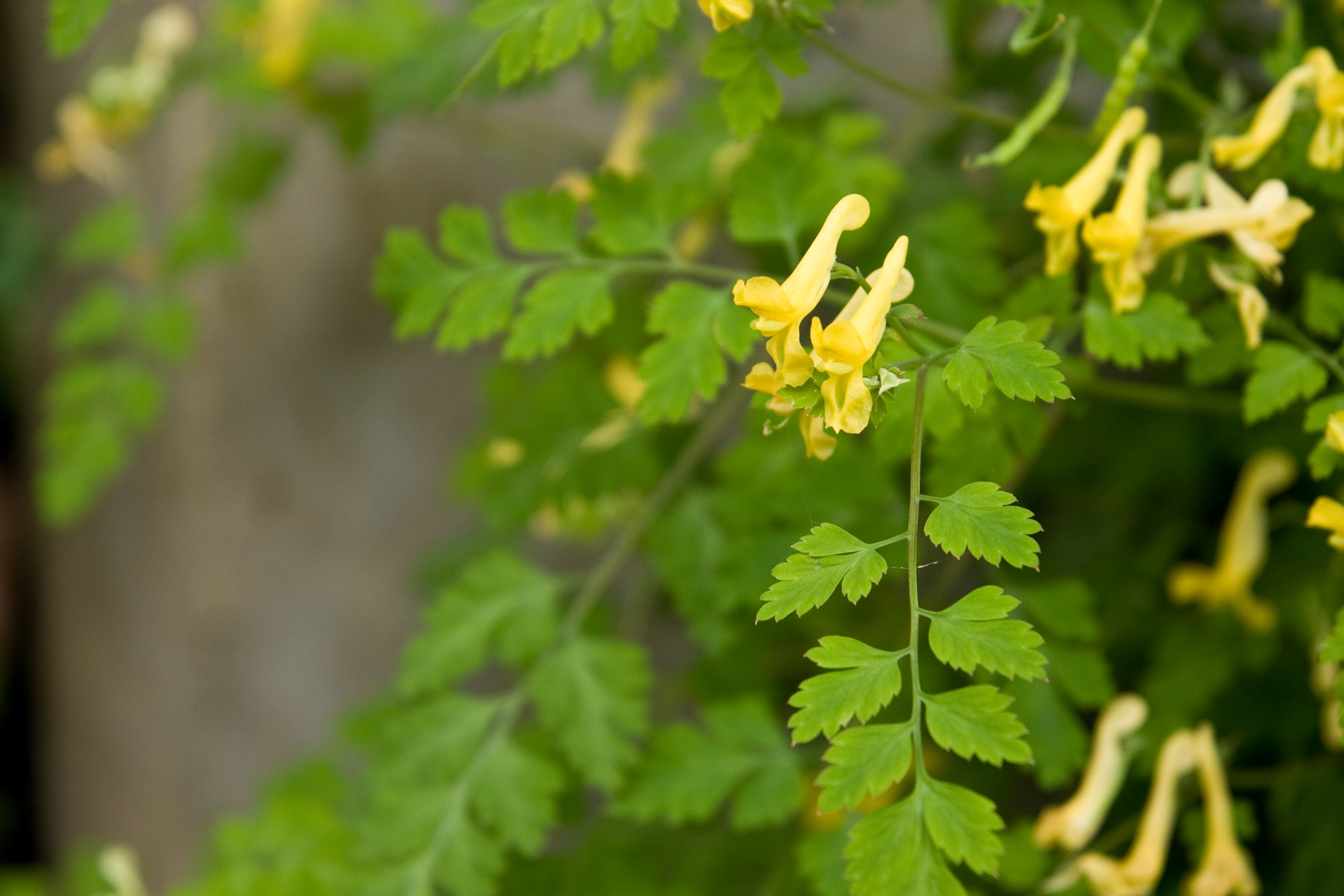
Corydalis pallida var. tenuis

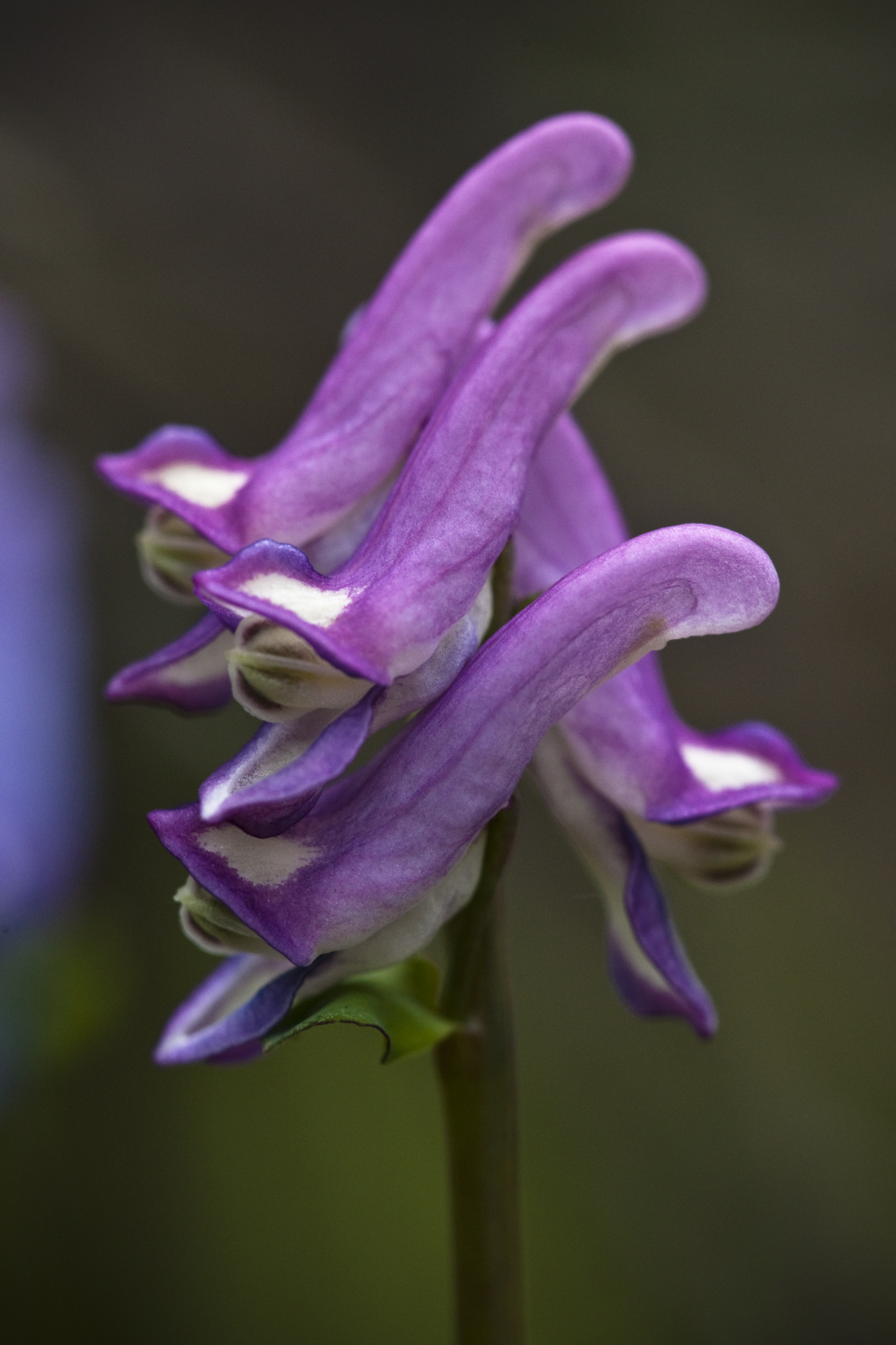
Corydalis pauciflora

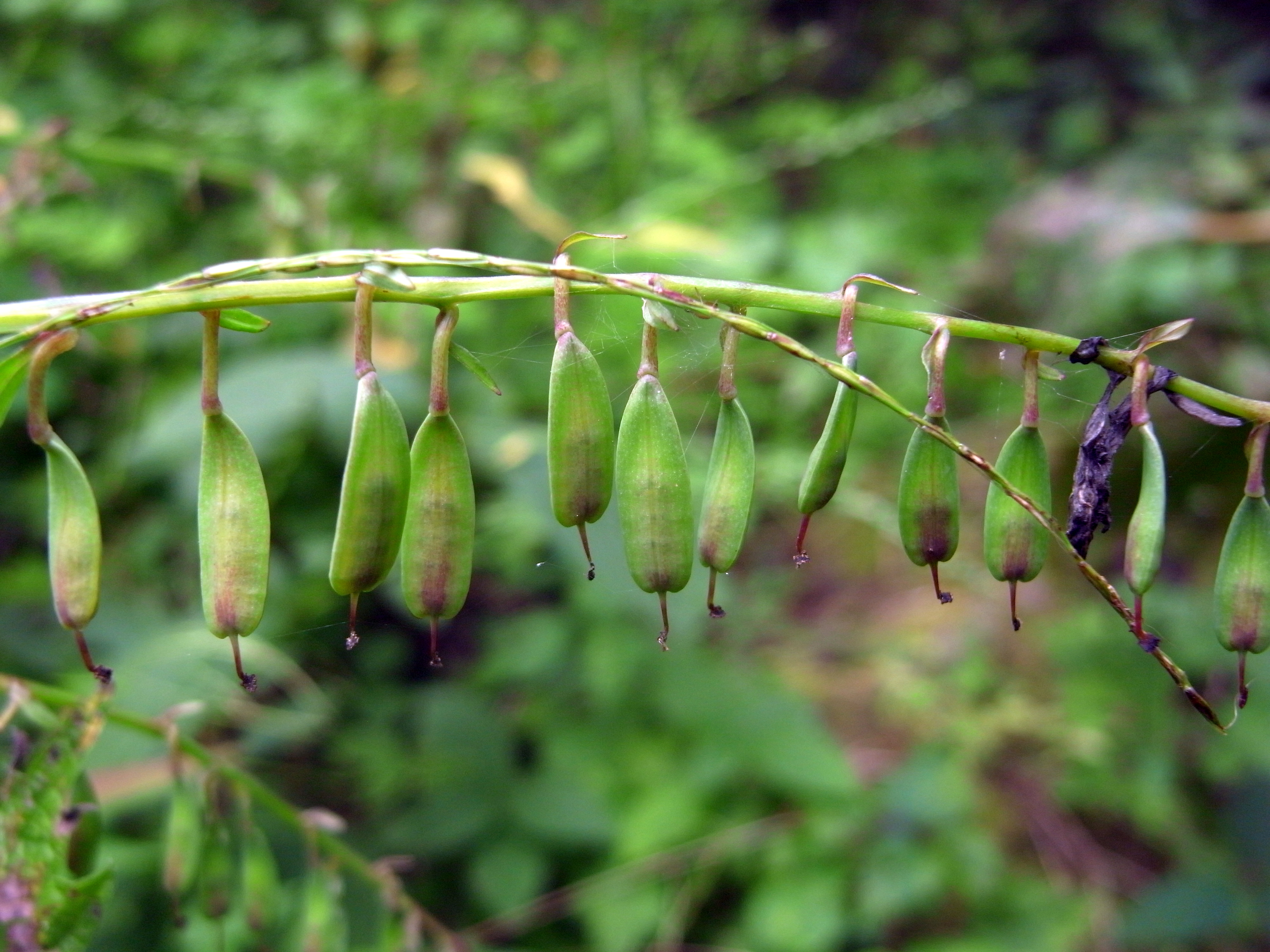
Seed pods of Corydalis pauciovulata

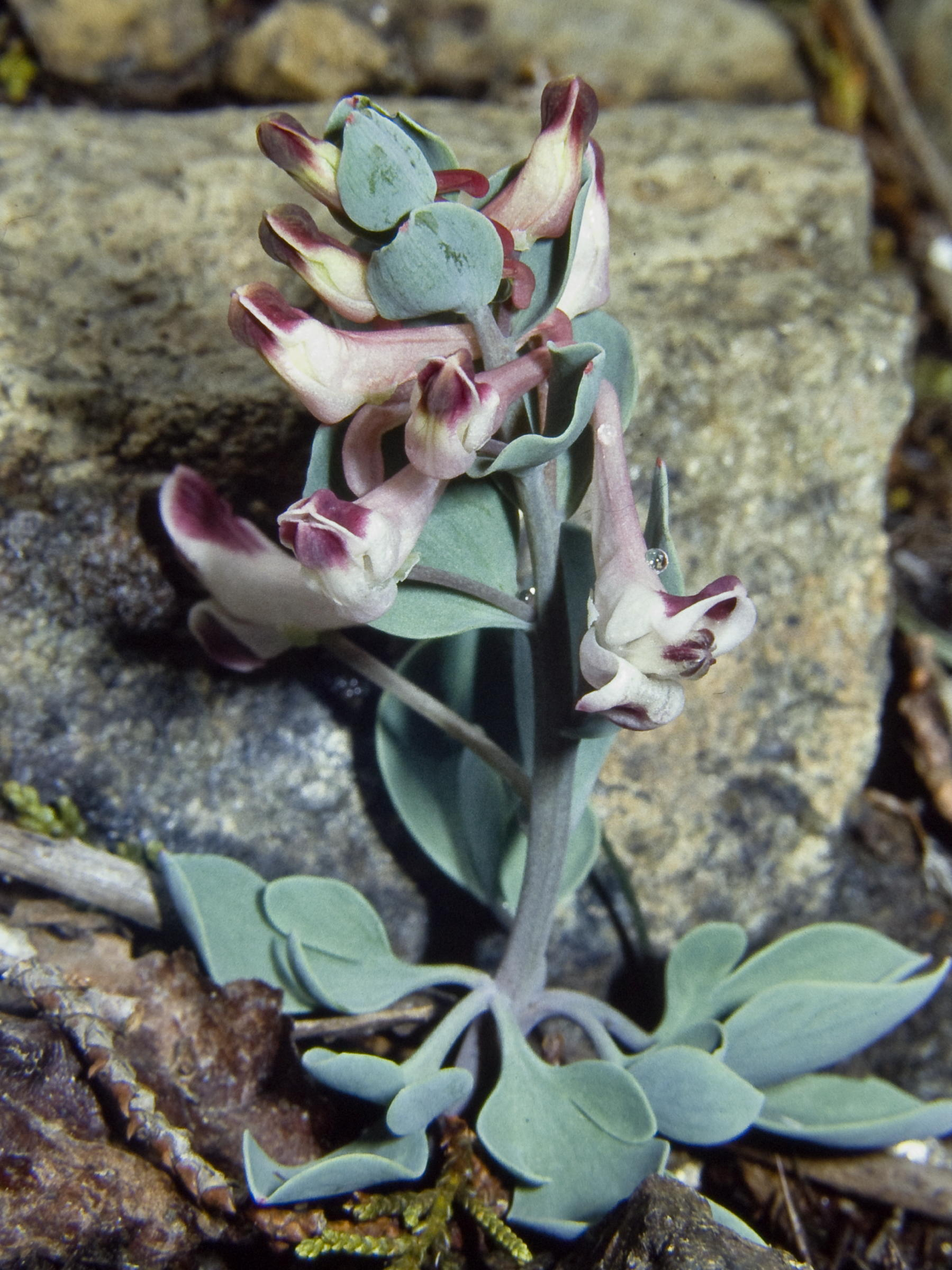
Corydalis rutifolia

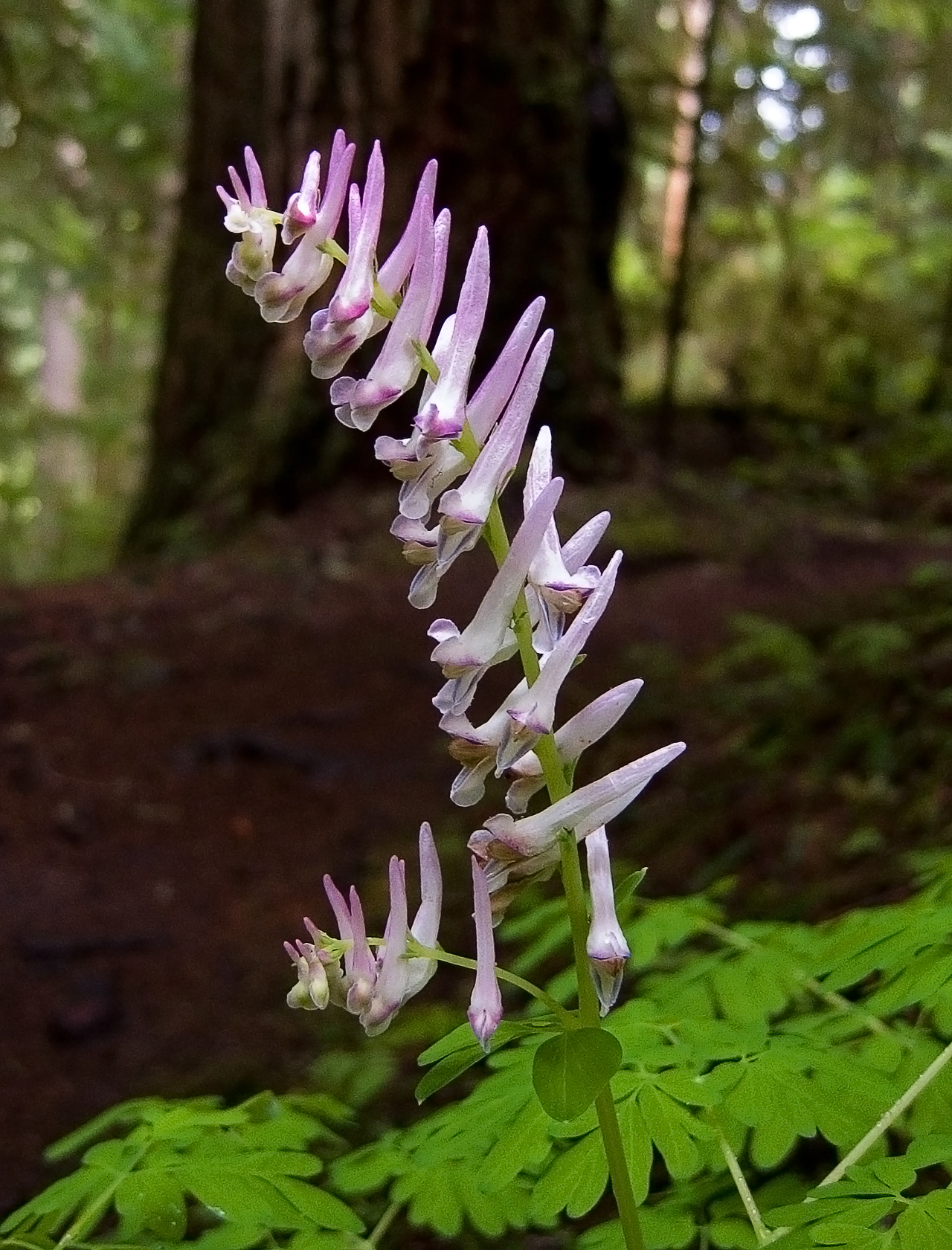
Corydalis scouleri

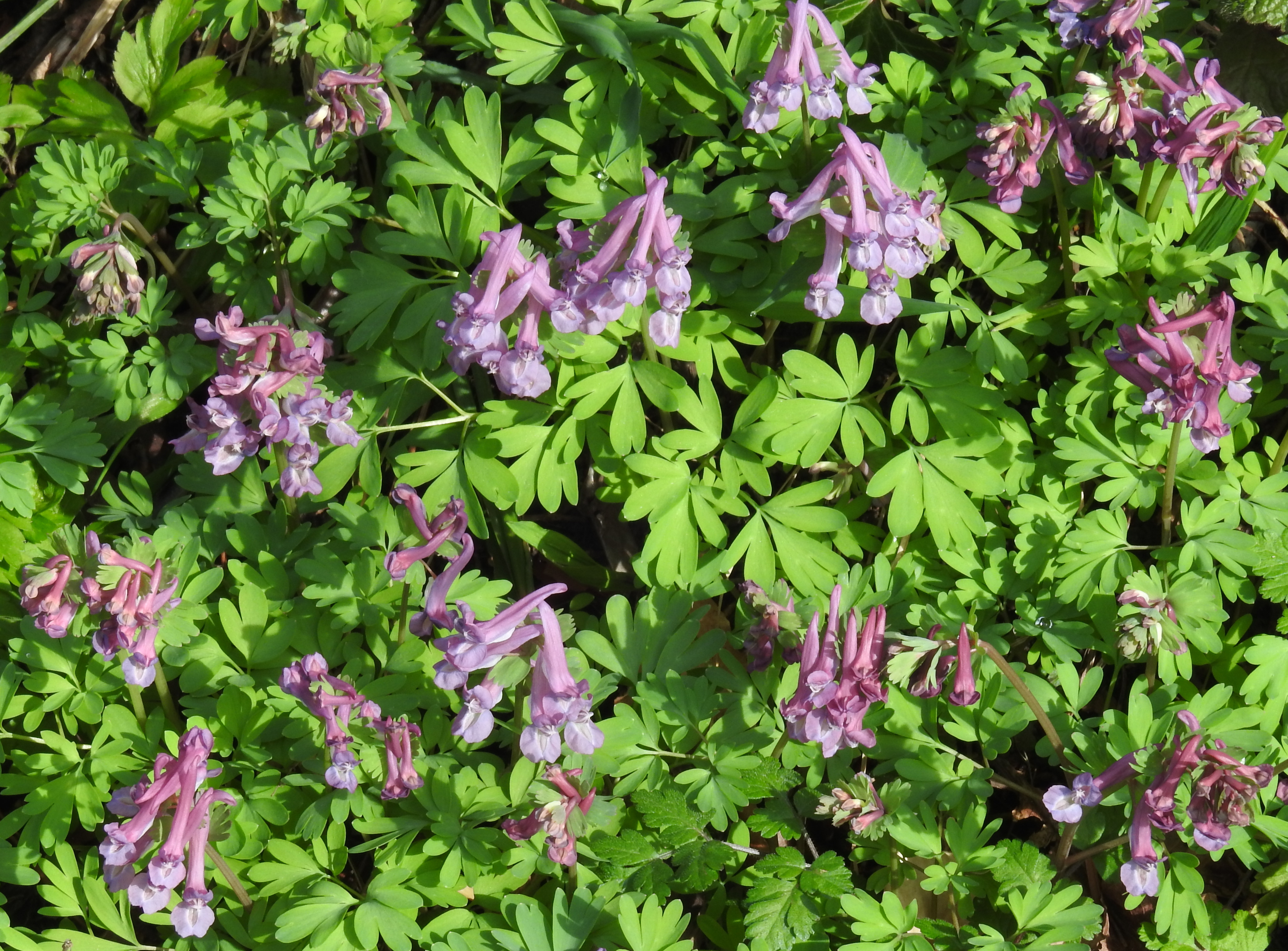
Corydalis solida

Corydalis vittae

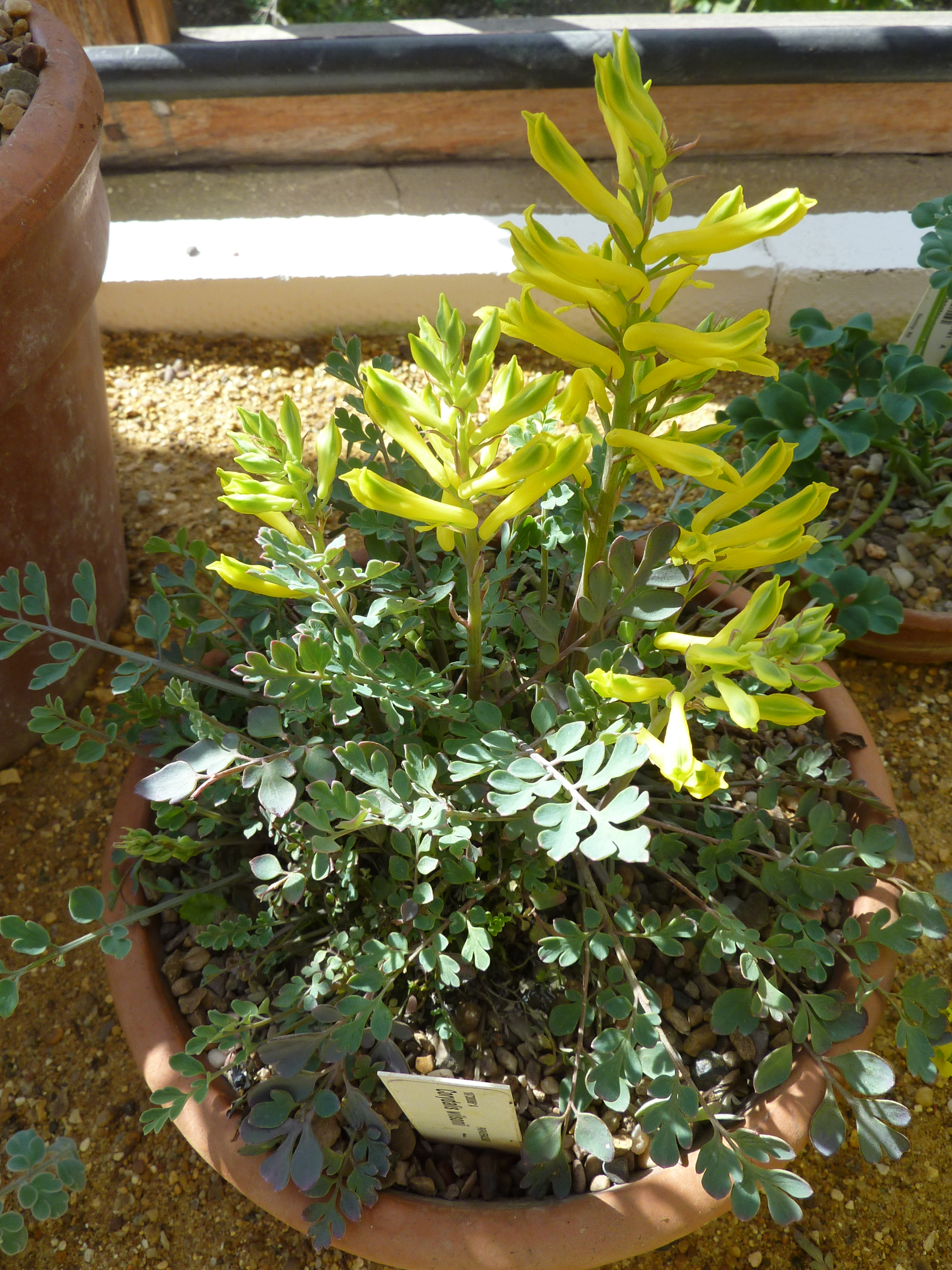
Corydalis wilsonii

=== Former species ===
Several former Corydalis have been moved to new genera:

Pseudofumaria

- Corydalis lutea = Pseudofumaria lutea – yellow corydalis
- Corydalis ochroleuca = Pseudofumaria alba

Capnoides

- Corydalis sempervirens = Capnoides sempervirens
