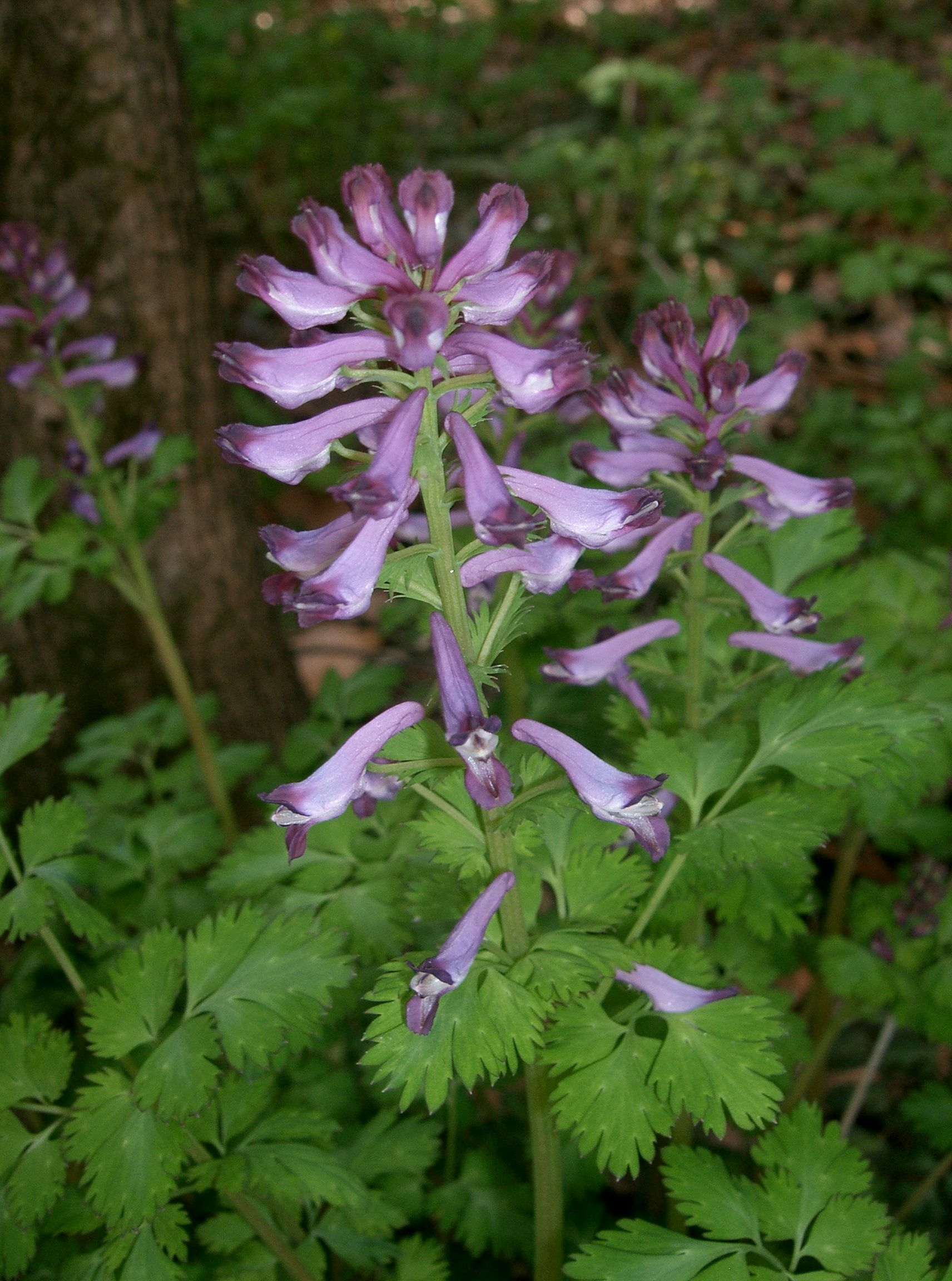

Scientific classification
- Kingdom: Plantae
- Clade: Tracheophytes
- Clade: Angiosperms
- Clade: Eudicots
- Order: Ranunculales
- Family: Papaveraceae
- Genus: Corydalis
- Species: C. incisa

Binomial name
- Corydalis incisa (Thunb.) Pers.

= Corydalis incisa =

Species of flowering plant in the poppy family

Corydalis incisa, incised fumewort, is an annual or biennial herbaceous species of plant in the poppy family. It is also known as purple keman or murasa-kike-man. Some authorities report it in the family Fumariaceae. The wildflower is native to Japan, Korea, Taiwan, and China, found in forests, clearings, and irrigation channels.

== Description ==
Corydalis incisa grows up to 2 feet (0.61 m) tall. The life cycle begins in spring when seeds germinate and grow into small rosettes supported by a tiny tuber. The leaves are compound and divided into 3 leaflets, and again into another 3 sub-leaflets that are lobed to serrated. The leaves go dormant for the summer and re-emerge directly from the tuber in the fall. They are evergreen throughout winter. Stems emerge in February and blooming occurs from March through early May. There are about 10 to 16 flowers per raceme. The fruits, which are oblong, pod-shaped capsules, form quickly. The first seeds disperse about three weeks after the first flowers. By early summer, the mature plants are dead. Corydalis incisa can be found in waterways, rock walls, disturbed areas, and "mesic and alluvial habitats".

== Invasive species ==
Incised fumewort is an introduced species in the United States, with populations in New York, Pennsylvania, Maryland, Virginia, West Virginia, North Carolina, Tennessee, and the District of Columbia. The first reported populations were found in Bronx and Westchester Counties in 2005 and 2014. The plant can readily escape cultivation; it spreads from seeds explosively ejected from the fruit. The seed contains an elaiosome, which attracts dispersing ants. Apparently thriving in fine alluvial sediments, Corydalis incisa forms dense stands, crowding out more desirable riparian understory plants.
