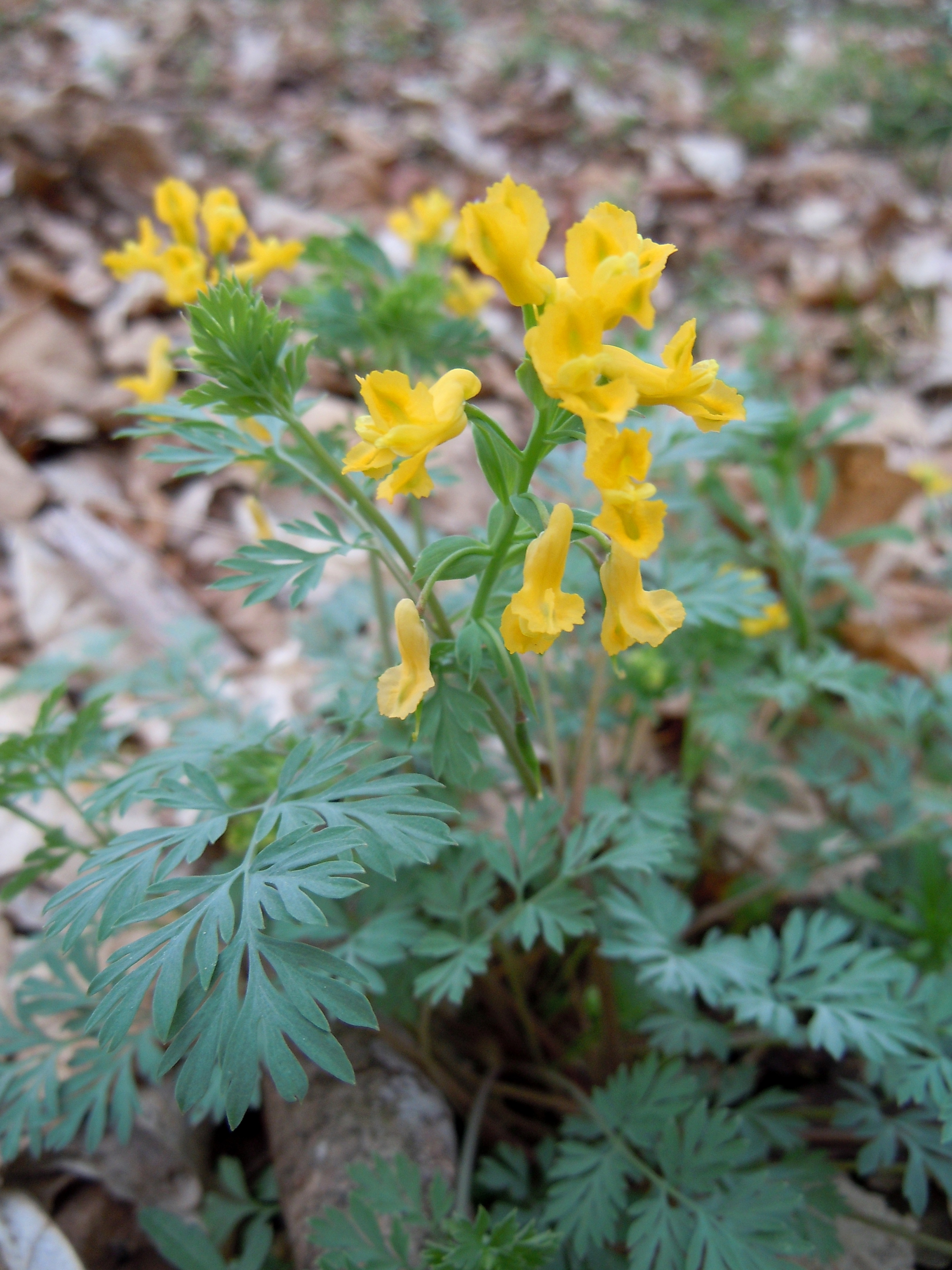

Scientific classification
- Kingdom: Plantae
- Clade: Tracheophytes
- Clade: Angiosperms
- Clade: Eudicots
- Order: Ranunculales
- Family: Papaveraceae
- Genus: Corydalis
- Species: C. micrantha

Binomial name
- Corydalis micrantha Engelm. ex A. Gray

Subspecies
- C. micrantha ssp. australis C. micrantha ssp. micrantha C. micrantha ssp. texensis

= Corydalis micrantha =

Species of flowering plant in the poppy family

Corydalis micrantha is a species of flowering plant in the poppy family (Papaveraceae), native to the United States. Common names include smallflower fumewort, slender corydalis, southern corydalis, and golden corydalis.

== Description ==
Corydalis micrantha belongs to genus Corydalis which comprises about 300 species. Corydalis micrantha is then further classified into three subspecies that include C. micrantha ssp. micrantha, C. micrantha ssp. australis and C. micrantha ssp. texensis.

== Distribution ==
Corydalis micrantha is found mainly in the United States, including Alabama, Arkansas, Florida, Georgia, Iowa, Illinois, Indiana, Kansas, Louisiana, Minnesota, Missouri, Mississippi, North Carolina, Nebraska, Oklahoma, South Carolina, South Carolina, South Dakota, Tennessee, Texas, and Wisconsin. The three subspecies of Corydalis micrantha are also found in specific parts of the United States. C. micrantha ssp. micrantha is usually found in central United States. C. micrantha ssp. australis is usually found in south-central to southern United States. C. micrantha ssp. texensis is only found in coastal south Texas. Corydalis micrantha ssp. australis is currently an endangered species in Illinois.

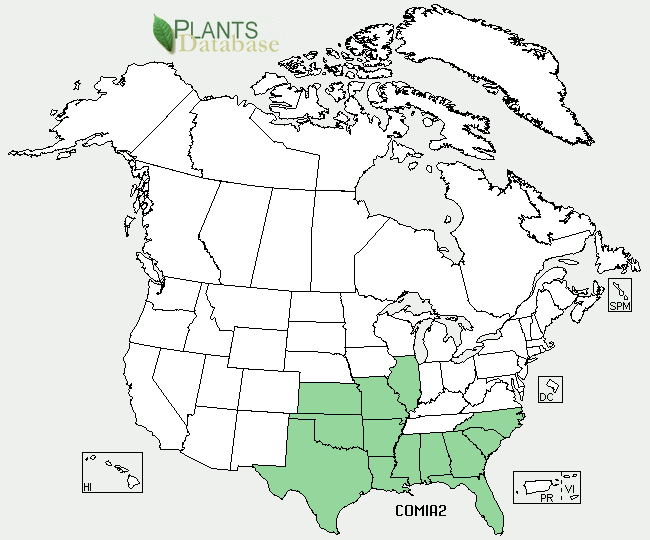
Regions where C. micrantha ssp. australis is found

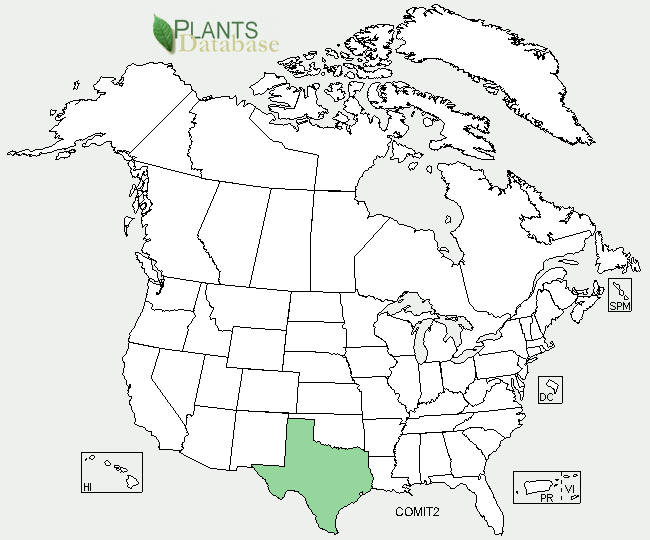
Regions where C. micrantha ssp. texensis is found

== Morphology ==
Corydalis micrantha subsp. micrantha consists of a rosette of basal leaves that are about 8 in (20 cm) across and also has several flowering stalks that are around 8" in length. The blades of the basal leaves can be up to 3 in (7.6 cm) long and 2 in (5.1 cm) across. These basal leaves are pinnately compound and have colors ranging from dull green to greyish blue, and they are also hairless. Each flowering stalk terminates in a raceme of flowers that can be up to 3" long. The flowers have short pedicles and have small bracts. The normal flowered racemes do not greatly exceed the leaves and are often short. The spurs of the flower are spherical at the tips of the flowers. The fruits are frequently firm and are usually 10–15 mm. long. Each of the flowers has a corolla that consists of two outer petals that range in color from yellow to pale yellow and two inner petals that are whiter and membranous. The C. micrantha ssp. australis racemes are normal flowered that often greatly exceeds the leaves. The spurs are not globose at the tip of the flower and have slender fruits that are 15–30 mm. long. The pedicels are erect and are usually 2–5 mm long and 1–3 mm wide. The corolla of the flower are light yellow and have spurred petals that are 9–15 mm long. The fruit capsule is erect and the body is cylindrical around 15–20 mm long. The seeds are about 1.5–2 mm broad and they do not contain a marginal ring. The leaves are green, but can also be glaucous with the stems branching from the base and the leaves are pinnately decompound. C. micrantha ssp. texensis stems are usually firm and when the stem dries out, the stem is strongly striated. The foliage can be from green to bluish-grey in color and the fruits produced are 25–30 mm long.

== Habitat and ecology ==
Corydalis micrantha is an annual plant and its growth habit is forb/herb. Habitats for C. micrantha ssp. micrantha are open rocky woodlands, sandy savannas, ledges along lightly wooded bluffs, glades, along railroad tracks near gravelly areas, and areas that are mulched around buildings. C. micrantha ssp. micrantha prefer habitats that have scarce ground vegetation and places that have some shade. C. micrantha ssp. australis usually grows around March–April and it is frequently found on sandy roadsides and fields, but it’s very rare on rocky slopes and mountains.
