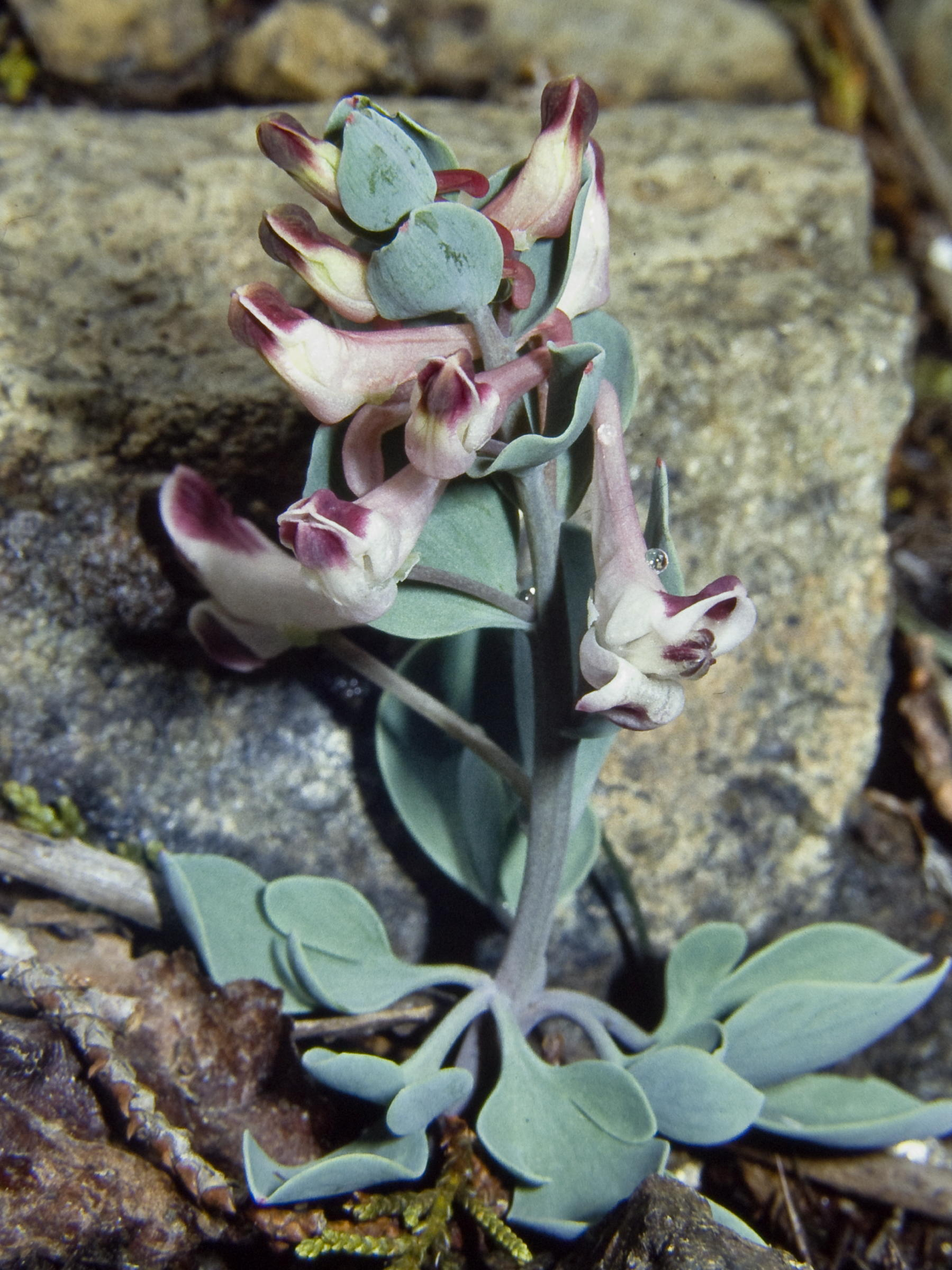
- In habitat in the Troodos Mountains

Scientific classification
- Kingdom: Plantae
- Clade: Tracheophytes
- Clade: Angiosperms
- Clade: Eudicots
- Order: Ranunculales
- Family: Papaveraceae
- Genus: Corydalis
- Species: C. rutifolia

Binomial name
- Corydalis rutifolia (Sm.) DC.

Synonyms
- Capnoides oppositifolia Kuntze; Capnoides rutifolia (Sm.) Kuntze; Capnoides verticillaris Kuntze; Cryptoceras modestum Schott; Cryptoceras oppositifolium Schott; Cryptoceras pulchellum Schott; Cryptoceras purpurans Schott; Cryptoceras purpurascens Boiss.; Cryptoceras rutifolium Schott; Fumaria rutifolia Sm.; Pistolochia rutifolia (Sm.) Soják

= Corydalis rutifolia =

Species of plant

Corydalis rutifolia is a species of flowering plant in the family Papaveraceae, endemic to the Troodos Mountains in Cyprus. It was first described by James Edward Smith in 1821 as Fumaria rutifolia.
