= Corydalis omeiana =

Scientific classification
- Kingdom: Plantae
- Clade: Tracheophytes
- Clade: Angiosperms
- Clade: Eudicots
- Order: Ranunculales
- Family: Papaveraceae
- Genus: Corydalis
- Species: C. omeiana

Binomial name
- Corydalis omeiana (C.Y.Wu & H.Chuang) Z.Y.Su & Lidén

Species of flowering plant

Corydalis omeiana is a species of flowering plant in the family Papaveraceae, native to central Sichuan province of China. It has gained the Royal Horticultural Society's Award of Garden Merit.
