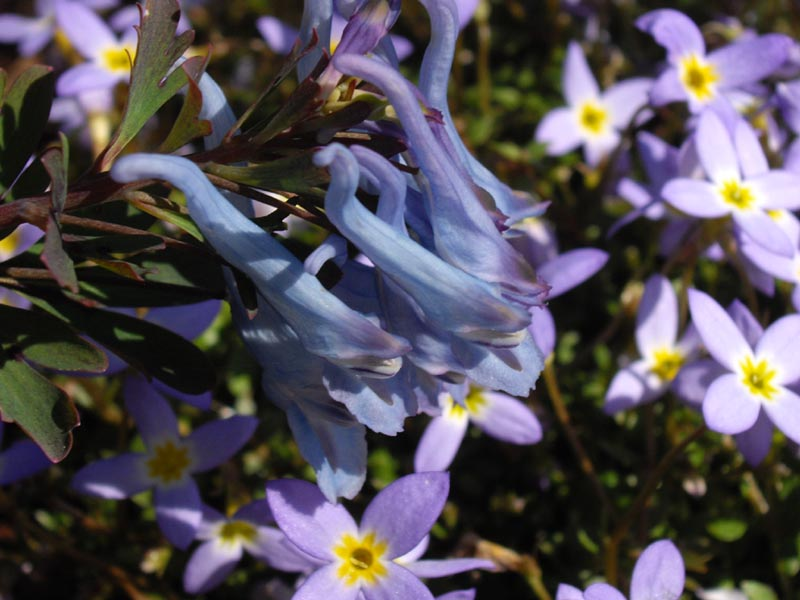

Scientific classification
- Kingdom: Plantae
- Clade: Tracheophytes
- Clade: Angiosperms
- Clade: Eudicots
- Order: Ranunculales
- Family: Papaveraceae
- Genus: Corydalis
- Species: C. flexuosa

Binomial name
- Corydalis flexuosa Franch.

= Corydalis flexuosa =

Species of flowering plant in the poppy family

Corydalis flexuosa is a species of flowering plant in the genus Corydalis, of the family Papaveraceae. It is a shade-loving perennial originating in woodland and mountainous areas of China. Growing to 30 cm (12 in), in spring it produces masses of bright blue tubular flowers with a white throat. It is summer dormant, meaning that the foliage dies down in summer.

This plant is widely cultivated. It is hardy to USDA zones 5–8. The cultivars 'Blue Panda' and 'Purple Leaf' have gained the Royal Horticultural Society's Award of Garden Merit.
