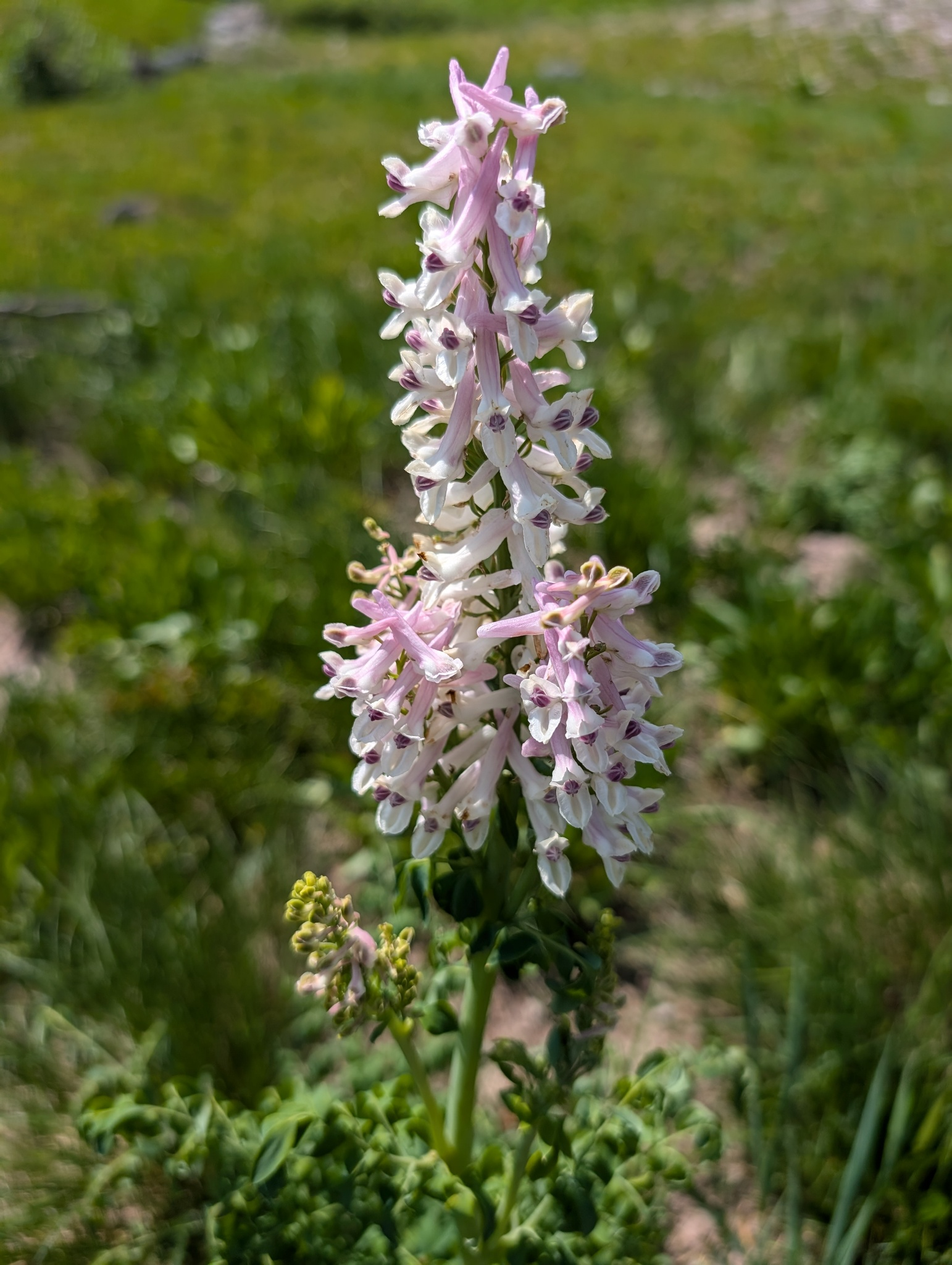
- Subspecies brandegeei in Gunnison County, Colorado

Conservation status
- Secure (NatureServe)

Scientific classification
- Kingdom: Plantae
- Clade: Tracheophytes
- Clade: Angiosperms
- Clade: Eudicots
- Order: Ranunculales
- Family: Papaveraceae
- Genus: Corydalis
- Species: C. caseana

Binomial name
- Corydalis caseana A.Gray

Subspecies and varieties
- C. c. subsp. aquae-gelidae; C. c. var. brachycarpa; C. c. subsp. brandegeei; C. c. subsp. caseana; C. c. subsp. cusickii; C. c. subsp. hastata

Synonyms
- Capnoides caseana

= Corydalis caseana =

Plant species in the poppy family

Corydalis caseana, also known as Sierra corydalis, Sierra fumewort, or fitweed, is a species of plant in the poppy family from the western United States.

== Description ==
Sierra corydalis is a perennial plant that grows one or more stems that are usually 1 to 1.5 meters (3.3–4.9 ft) tall, but that can grow to almost 2.4 m (7.9 ft), larger any other member of its genus except for possibly Corydalis gigantea. The stems are hollow, thick, and upright; they can be unbranched or branch towards the top. The plants grow from large, tuberous roots.

Each stem has three to six leaves, most often five. The leaves are glaucous, covered in a powdery white wax that can be rubbed off, giving them a gray-green color. Each leaf is compound two to four times, giving them a fern like appearance, and can be as much as 1 m (3.3 ft) long with the end lobes of the lower leaves narrowly to broadly elliptic in shape and measuring 1–5 cm long.

The flowers have four petals in two pairs, the outer two are hood shaped with the upper one having a long, nectar filled spur. The petals are mainly pink to white, but the inner ones are red to purple at the end. The outer petal without a spur measures 10–15 millimeters long while the inner petals are 7–12 mm. The slightly larger upper petal is 16–25 mm with a spur that is 9-16 mm. The inflorescences are spike-like, the 30 to 200 flowers appearing to be directly attached to the main stem, but in fact having a pedicel that is 3–5 millimeters long.

The fruits are capsules with an ellipsoid shape that are 10-15 mm long by 3–5 mm. The many seeds within are about 2.5 mm in diameter with a warty surface.

== Taxonomy ==
Corydalis caseana is classified in the genus Corydalis as part of the Papaveraceae family. It was scientifically described and named in 1874 by Asa Gray. It has five accepted subspecies and one variety. Each of these has a limited range, none growing in more than two states.

=== Corydalis caseana subsp. aquae-gelidae ===
This subspecies was described in 1956 as a species named Corydalis aquae-gelidae by Morton Peck and Warren C. Wilson, though it is treated as a species in the Flora of North America the entry also notes doubts as to its validity. It is native to southern Washington and northern Oregon. In Oregon it grows in five counties from Lane County northward and in Washington it is found in Clark, Cowlitz, and Skamania counties. It can be found from elevations of 30 meters (98 ft) to as high as 1,100 meters (3,600 ft).

=== Corydalis caseana var. brachycarpa ===
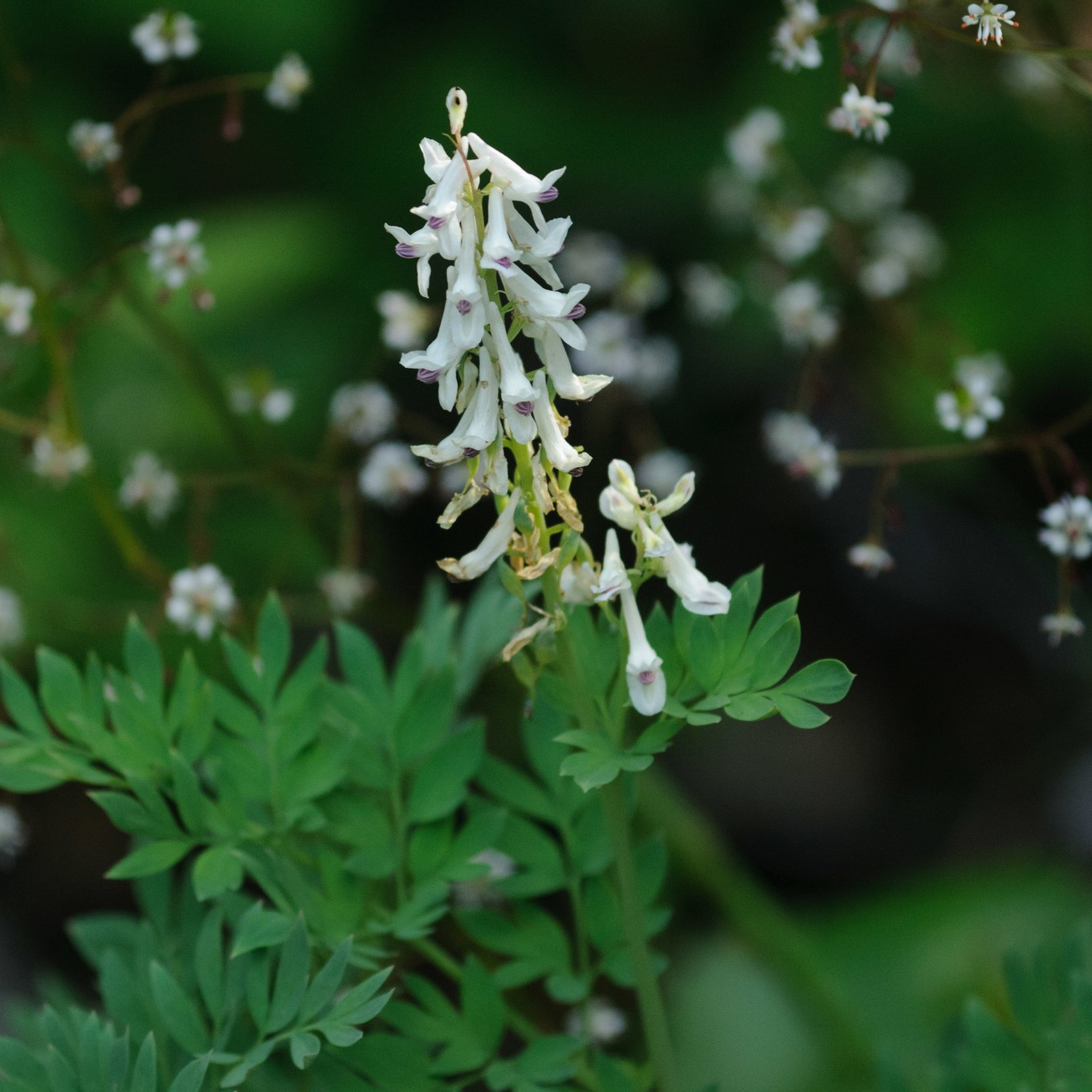
Var. brachycarpa in the Wasatch Mountains

This variety was described as a species named Capnoides brachycarpa by Per Axel Rydberg in 1907. The description of it as a variety was published in 2010 by Noel Herman Holmgren and Patricia Kern Holmgren. It is only found in Utah in Weber, Salt Lake, Utah, and Wasatch counties.

=== Corydalis caseana subsp. brandegeei ===
Initially described as a species in 1880, this taxa has been considered a subspecies since 1947. It grows in Colorado and northern New Mexico. Observations of the subspecies have only been made in Rio Arriba County, New Mexico, but it grows in six mountainous counties in southwestern Colorado.

=== Corydalis caseana subsp. caseana ===
The antonymic subspecies is native to California and grows in the southern and northern parts of the high Sierra Nevada, but not central areas. They are also part of the flora of the high Cascade Range, the Warner Mountains, and the Modoc Plateau at elevations of 1,100–2,800 meters (3,600–9,200 ft). However, the Natural Resources Conservation Service only has records for the subspecies in six northern counties.

=== Corydalis caseana subsp. cusickii ===
Like many of the other subspecies cusickii was initially thought to be a species when described by Sereno Watson in 1880, but was classified as a subspecies by Gerald Bruce Ownbey in 1947. It is from northeast Oregon and parts of Idaho. In Oregon it is known from just Baker, Union, and Wallowa counties, but there are records for it in seven counties in Idaho.

=== Corydalis caseana subsp. hastata ===
This subspecies was also described as a species by Rydbert in 1907 and later described as a subspecies by Ownbey in 1947. It only grows in four counties in the southern Idaho panhandle, Idaho, Clearwater, Latah, and Shoshone.

It has 16 synonyms of the species or one of its subspecies or one variety.

Table of Synonyms
Name	Year	Rank	Synonym of:	Notes
Capnoides bidwelliae (S.Watson) Greene	1891	species	subsp. caseana	= het.
Capnoides brachycarpa Rydb.	1907	species	var. brachycarpa	≡ hom.
Capnoides brandegeei (S.Watson) A.Heller	1898	species	subsp. brandegeei	≡ hom.
Capnoides caseana (A.Gray) Greene	1891	species	C. caseana	≡ hom.
Capnoides cusickii (S.Watson) A.Heller	1898	species	subsp. cusickii	≡ hom.
Capnoides hastata Rydb.	1907	species	subsp. hastata	≡ hom.
Corydalis aquae-gelidae M.Peck & W.C.Wilson	1956	species	subsp. aquae-gelidae	≡ hom.
Corydalis bidwelliae S.Watson	1880	species	subsp. caseana	= het.
Corydalis brachycarpa (Rydb.) Fedde	1912	species	var. brachycarpa	≡ hom.
Corydalis brandegeei S.Watson	1880	species	subsp. brandegeei	≡ hom.
Corydalis caseana subsp. brachycarpa (Rydb.) G.B.Ownbey	1947	subspecies	var. brachycarpa	≡ hom.
Corydalis caseana var. cusickii (S.Watson) C.L.Hitchc.	1964	variety	subsp. cusickii	≡ hom.
Corydalis caseana var. hastata (Rydb.) C.L.Hitchc.	1964	variety	subsp. hastata	≡ hom.
Corydalis cusickii S.Watson	1880	species	subsp. cusickii	≡ hom.
Corydalis cusickii var. hastata (Rydb.) Fedde	1913	variety	subsp. hastata	≡ hom.
Corydalis hastata (Rydb.) Fedde	1912	species	subsp. hastata	≡ hom.
Notes: ≡ homotypic synonym; = heterotypic synonym

=== Names ===
Gray selected the species name, caseana, to honor Eliphalet Lewis Case. Case was an amateur botanist who collected early specimens of the species in California. It is frequently known by just the common name fitweed, but the herb Eryngium foetidum is also called this. C. caseana is called fitweed due to the convulsions and distressed calls of poisoned animals being referred to as "fits". It is also called Sierra corydalis, pink corydalis, fitweed corydalis, Sierra fumewort, and Sierran fumewort. The genus name corydalis is also used as a common name for this and other species.

== Toxicity ==
Sierra corydalis is very poisonous to horses and is quite dangerous as they are not reluctant to eat it. Symptoms include painting, seizures, staggering, and snapping their mouths are possible within minutes of consumption.

== Range and habitat ==
Sierra corydalis is native to seven western US states.

It specializes in areas that have poor, mineral soils that are constantly moist.
