= Joseph Philippe de Clairville =

French botanist and entomologist (1742–1830)

Joseph Philippe de Clairville (1742 – 31 July 1830) was a notable French botanist and entomologist, who was mainly active in Switzerland. De Clairville’s collection of Coleoptera, his chief interest, is in the Natural History Museum in Basel. He was also interested in Diptera and Odonata.

After his stay in Nyon and Bex in the French-speaking part of Switzerland, he moved to Winterthur in 1782, where he lived the most time until his death in 1830.

De Clairville wrote Helvetische Entomologie published in Zürich in 1798, wrote Manuel d'herborisation en Suisse et en Valais published in 1811, and translated Naturgeschichte der Hof- und Stubenvögel by Johann Matthäus Bechstein into French under the titles Manuel de l'amateur des oiseaux de volière (1825).

== Sources ==
- Duméril, C. A. M. C. 1823: [Biographien] - Paris; Strasbourg, F. G. Levrault 262
- Evenhuis, N. L. 1997: Litteratura taxonomica dipterorum (1758-1930). Volume 1 (A-K); Volume 2 (L-Z). - Leiden, Backhuys Publishers 1; 2 VII+1-426; 427-871
- Geilinger 1935: [Clairville, J. P. de] - Mitt. naturw. Ges. Winterthur 19
- Kiauta, B. 1978: [Clairville, J. P. de] - Odonatologica 7(3)
- Mitlheilungen der Nanturwissenschaftlichen Gesellschaft Winterthur, 19, 1932, p. 255-291.
