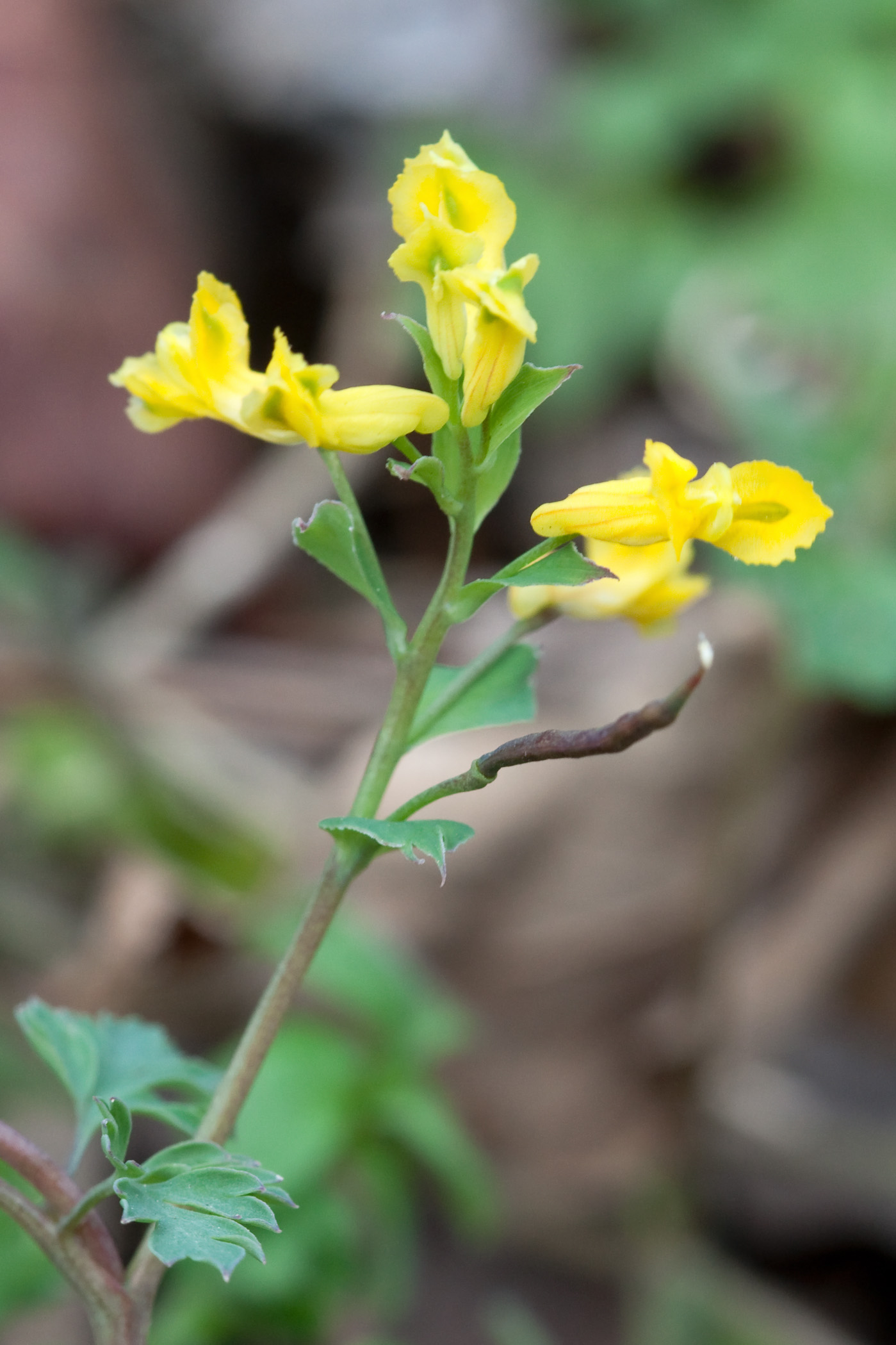

Conservation status
- Secure (NatureServe)

Scientific classification
- Kingdom: Plantae
- Clade: Tracheophytes
- Clade: Angiosperms
- Clade: Eudicots
- Order: Ranunculales
- Family: Papaveraceae
- Genus: Corydalis
- Species: C. flavula

Binomial name
- Corydalis flavula (Raf.) DC.

= Corydalis flavula =

Yellow fumewort

Species of flowering plant in the poppy family

Corydalis flavula (yellow fumewort, yellow harlequin, fume-root, yellow fumitory; syn. Capnoides flavulum (Raf.) Kuntze, Fumaria flavula Raf.) is an herbaceous perennial plant native to the eastern United States. Its natural habitat is open woods and slopes.

== Status and phenology ==
=== Threats ===
Corydalis flavula occurs throughout most of the eastern half of the United States and in parts of Canada. It is a pioneer species that requires disturbance to thrive. Disturbance (mostly in the form of flooding, as it is a floodplain species) helps to keep the overarching canopy at the right density for its light requirements. Because of this requirement, C. flavula is threatened primarily by human land use, which often results in conversion of habitat to mowed lawns and managed streams and rivers, removing the disturbance and canopy the plant requires.

==== Michigan ====
Corydalis flavula is a state threatened plant in Michigan. It occurs in floodplains under relatively open forest canopy. It is at the north end of its range in the US in Michigan, helping to explain why it is threatened in Michigan and only one other state (Connecticut) in its range. Current focused research on the plant at one of its strongholds shows that it can adapt to some other habitats that mimic the disturbance and canopy cover of a floodplain forest.

Given that the plant is at the north end of its range, and that climate change impacts will increase temperatures and flooding due to more intense and frequent rain events in Michigan in the next 50 years, the plant has a good chance of flourishing under these conditions. The National Climate Assessment predicts higher temperatures in all seasons in Michigan (summer differences from current will be larger than winter differences). It also predicts that rain events will be increasingly concentrated in the spring and fall seasons and in fewer, heavier bursts (1-3 inches average), which will increase flooding in all categories of streams.

At Ft. Custer Training Center (FCTC) in southwest Michigan, C. flavula was found when an armory was being constructed in 1995. This led the Michigan Department of Military and Veterans Affairs to seek a permit from the Michigan Department of Natural Resources for the take of the plant during the construction of the building. The permit required ten years of monitoring along a transect in a black locust dominated area near the armory construction. At the end of the ten years it was determined that further surveys needed to be conducted elsewhere on the installation, not only because it was apparent the plant occurred elsewhere on the 7,500 acre property, but also because there was the threat of more take due to new construction in 2012. The embedded map shows the potential habitat considered viable in the 2010 consideration of where to survey to manage the construction threat in 2012.

These surveys of the property found C. flavula in extensive areas elsewhere on the installation, some areas having healthy populations across tens of acres.

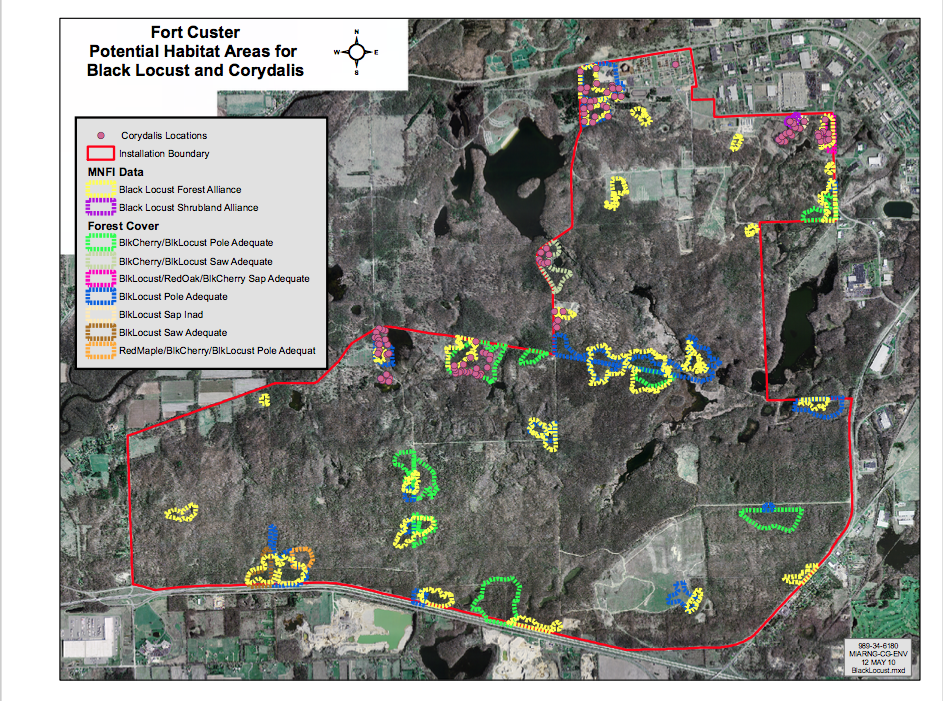
This photo shows the potential habitat areas for C. flavula, a state threatened plant in Michigan, and Black Locust, an invasive species in Michigan, at Fort Custer Training Center, where research is being conducted on habitat specifics for C. flavula.

This led the Michigan Department of Military and Veterans Affairs to seek The management of the species to increase its population is unclear. However, the work being done at FCTC is showing that disturbance is key. Prescribed fire opens up the understory and seems to promote a flush either the year of the burn or the year after, depending on conditions and seasonality of the burn. Other disturbance events that have promoted it on FCTC lands are large soil erosion events near an existing population, and in one instance a timber harvest. It has also become clear that this plant is not exclusively dependent on floodplains, their soil, their disturbance regime and the overstory particular to a floodplain. Indeed, the plant has been found to flourish under the black locusts (Robinia pseudoacacia) (illustrated by the embedded map). Research since the map was developed has found extensive populations in many areas far from a floodplain but very much in a disturbance-based system. Black locust as a species is also a pioneer and dependent upon disturbance in its early years. The tree emits an allelopathic chemical that impacts many plants and generally promotes a relatively barren understory. For reasons not yet understood, pale fumewort has taken to black locust understory quite well.

== Historical uses ==
Corydalis flavula belongs to the Ranunculales order, an order of plants that often contains many alkaloids that make plants distasteful to toxic. Early use by Native Americans involved inhalation of the smoke of a charring plant. Because early American medicine gleaned some of the aboriginal understandings of the power of plant alkaloids like heroin for pain and belladonna for hearing issues, it was used for things like staunching a bleeding wound, and as an antiemetic. Chinese medicine uses plants in this genus as a pain reliever, muscle relaxant, and to slow the gastrointestinal system.
