= Corydalis Alkaloids =

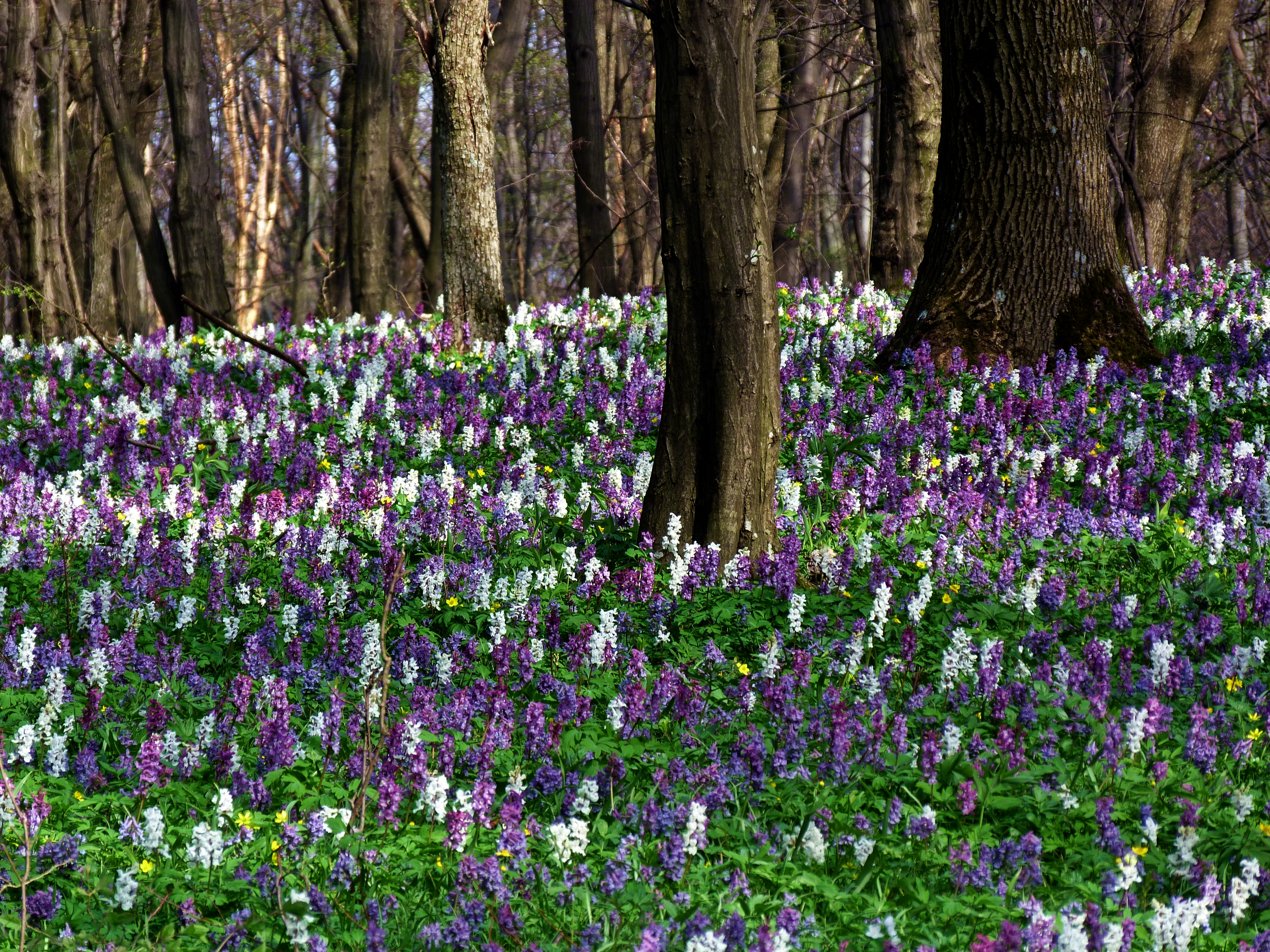
Corydalis cava

Corydalis Alkaloids are categorized as natural products of the isoquinoline alkaloid type.

== Occurrence ==
Corydalis alkaloids are primarily located within the roots of Corydalis cava and various other Corydalis species.

== Representatives ==
The representatives of Corydalis alkaloids include d-tetrahydrocoptisine (also known as d- or (+)-stylopine), d-canadine, and hydrohydrastinine.

d- or (+)-Stylopine.

d- or (+)-Canadine

Hydrohydrastinine

== Properties ==
Corydalis alkaloids exhibit certain narcotic and muscle-paralyzing effects. Historically, the powdered rhizomes of Corydalis alkaloid-containing plants enjoyed popularity as a vermifuge and menstrual stimulant.
