= Stånga =

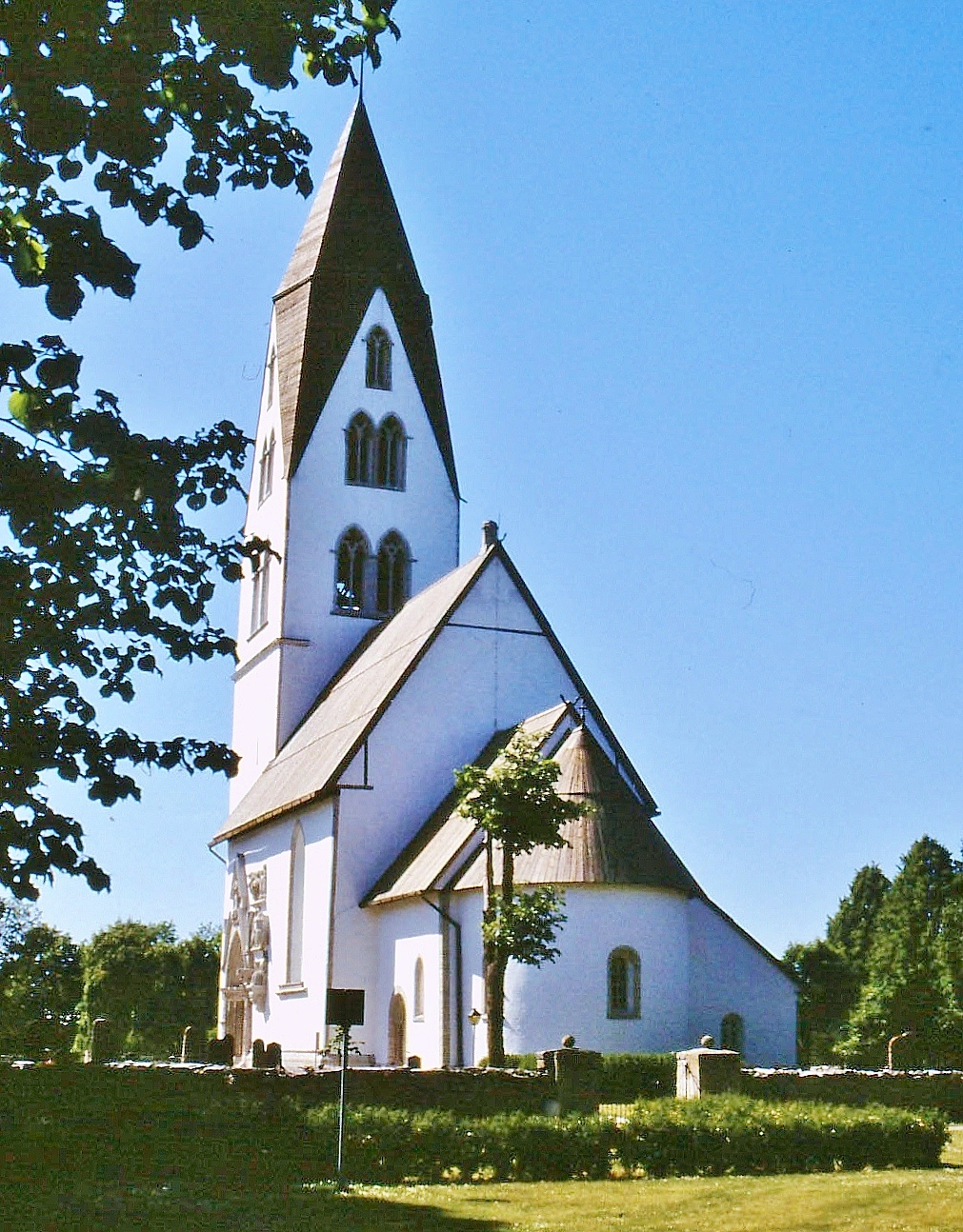
- Stånga Church

- Location within Gotland
- Coordinates: 57°16′53″N 18°28′17″E
- Country: Sweden
- Province: Gotland
- County: Gotland County
- Municipality: Gotland Municipality

Area
  - Total: 1.05 km^{2} (0.41 sq mi)
- Time zone: UTC+1 (CET)
  - Summer (DST): UTC+2 (CEST)

Stånga is a locality on the Swedish island of Gotland, with 491 inhabitants in 2014.

Stånga is also the name of the larger populated area, socken (not to be confused with parish). It comprises the same area as the administrative Stånga District, established on 1 January 2016.

Stånga is most noted for hosting the annual Stånga Games (Swedish: Stångaspelen).

== Geography ==
Stånga is the name of the locality surrounding the medieval Stånga Church, sometimes referred to as Stånga kyrkby. It is also the name of the socken as well as the district. Stånga is located in the southeast part of Gotland.

As of 2019, Stånga Church belongs to Stånga-Burs parish in Burs pastorat, along with the church in Burs.

One of the asteroids in the asteroid belt, 10131 Stånga, is named after this place.

== Stånga Games ==
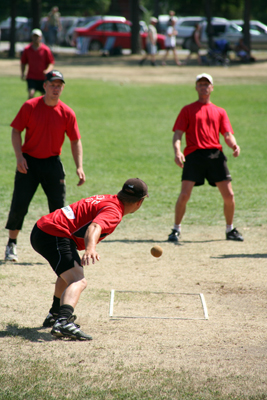
Stånga Games (2006)

The Stånga Games (Stångaspelen), also referred to as the "Gotland Olympic Games", is an annual sports competition in Stånga. The first games were concluded on 27 July 1924. The games are held during five days around the second weekend in July and gathers about 2000 participants. Competitions are held in various Gutnish disciplines, some dating back to the Viking Age. The sports include Varpa, Pärk, Caber toss, Gutnish pentathlon, Pillow fight on a pole (Herre på stång), Leg hook (Rövkrok), Hobble kick (Sparka Bleistre), Tug of war, eight-man teams (Dragkamp), Two-men tug of war, facing (Att dra hank), Two-men tug of war, back to back (Att täme stäut) etc.
