= Burs, Gotland =

Burs
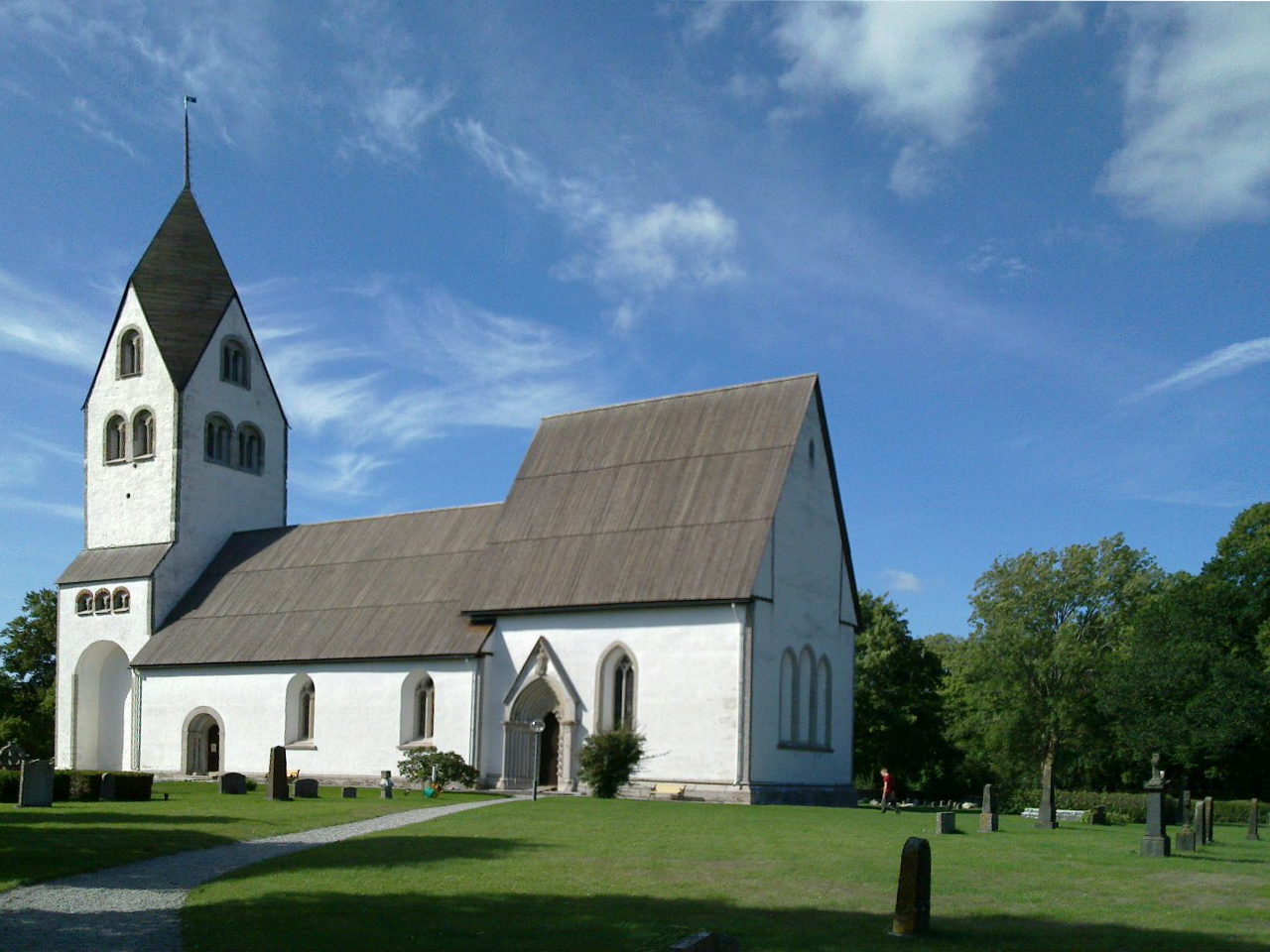
- Burs Church

- Location within Gotland
- Coordinates: 57°15′03″N 18°30′43″E
- Country: Sweden
- Province: Gotland
- County: Gotland County
- Municipality: Gotland Municipality

Area
  - Total: 42 km^{2} (16 sq mi)

Population (2014)
  - Total: 329
- Time zone: UTC+1 (CET)
  - Summer (DST): UTC+2 (CEST)
- Website: www.burs.nu/forsta-sidan at the Wayback Machine (archived 2015-07-25)

Burs (Swedish pronunciation: [ˈbɵʂː]) is a populated area, a socken (not to be confused with parish), on the Swedish island of Gotland. It comprises the same area as the administrative Burs District, established on 1 January 2016. As of 2015, Gustaf Edman from Burs was probably Sweden's tallest man.

== Geography ==
Burs is the name of the socken as well as the district. It is also the name of the small 0.18 km^{2} (0.069 mi^{2}) village surrounding the Burs Church, sometimes referred to as Burs kyrkby. Located on the southeast coast of Gotland it is a flat country. Part of the farmland has been gained by draining the Rone and Lye mires, as well as Lake Burs.

As of 2019, Burs Church belongs to Stånga-Burs parish in Burs pastorat, along with the church in Stånga.

One of the asteroids in the asteroid belt, 8681 Burs, is named after this place.

== Etymology ==
The name Burs is derived from burg meaning "gravel ridge" or "gravel ground".

== History ==
A hoard of 646 Roman denarii was discovered by farm workers, between Sigdes and Burs, which was published by numismatist Rosa Norström in 1907.

Burs dates back to Medieval times. It is the name of a larger area surrounding the medieval Burs Church. It was originally part of the Burs thing, which in turn was in the southernmost of the three original districts (similar to ridings) that Gotland was divided into during the Middle Ages. In 1862, it became an independent municipality. In 1952, it was incorporated into the Stånga municipality and in 1971, all of Gotland became one municipality. The boatswains from Burs under the allotment system, were part of the Second Gotlandic Boatswains Company.

Burs has a number of Bronze Age grave mounds and stone ships. The remnants from the Iron Age consists of about ten grave fields, house foundations, collapsed stone walls and grinding grooves.

At Sigdes farm in Burs, there is a limestone ring-cross dating from the later part of the 16th century. According to one legend, it marks the place of an ancient battle. Another legend tells the story about a groom who died there. The cross is inscribed with and almost obliterated Latin text, which has been interpreted by L F Läffler: "This cross marks the place where Ragnvald, former vicar and now buried in Lau, was struck by death in the year of 1448 on Michael's day to whom You, oh almighty king may show kindness." The cross have some runes chiseled on the back.

== The Giant ==
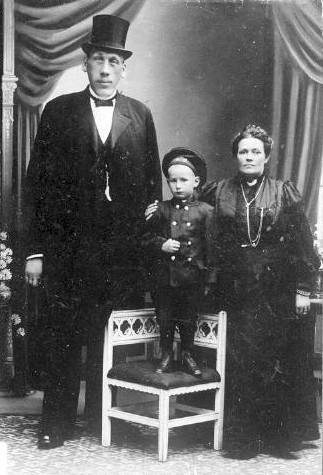
Gustaf Edman with his wife Anna and son Gustaf

Karl Gustaf Emmerik Edman (also known as The Giant) (4 February 1882 – 3 October 1912) born at Bondare in Burs and died in Finland, is probably Sweden's tallest man up to date. He is listed as the eleventh-tallest in the world in the Guinness Book of Records. His parents were both of normal length. When he died he was supposedly 2.43 m (8 ft 0 in) tall and weighed 240 kg (530 lb). A photograph indicates that he was in fact 2.25 m (7 ft 5 in) His shoes in size 56 are still kept in a small museum in Burs. He started life as a farmhand and later toured with circuses and sideshows at markets. He married Anna Regina Edman from Jämtland and they had two children of normal size. He died of typhus during a tour in Finland, 30 years old.

A wooden statue of Edman has been erected in Burs at the crossroads to Busskveia. The statue was made by Armin Irwahn in 1996.
