= Burs Church =

- Burs kyrka
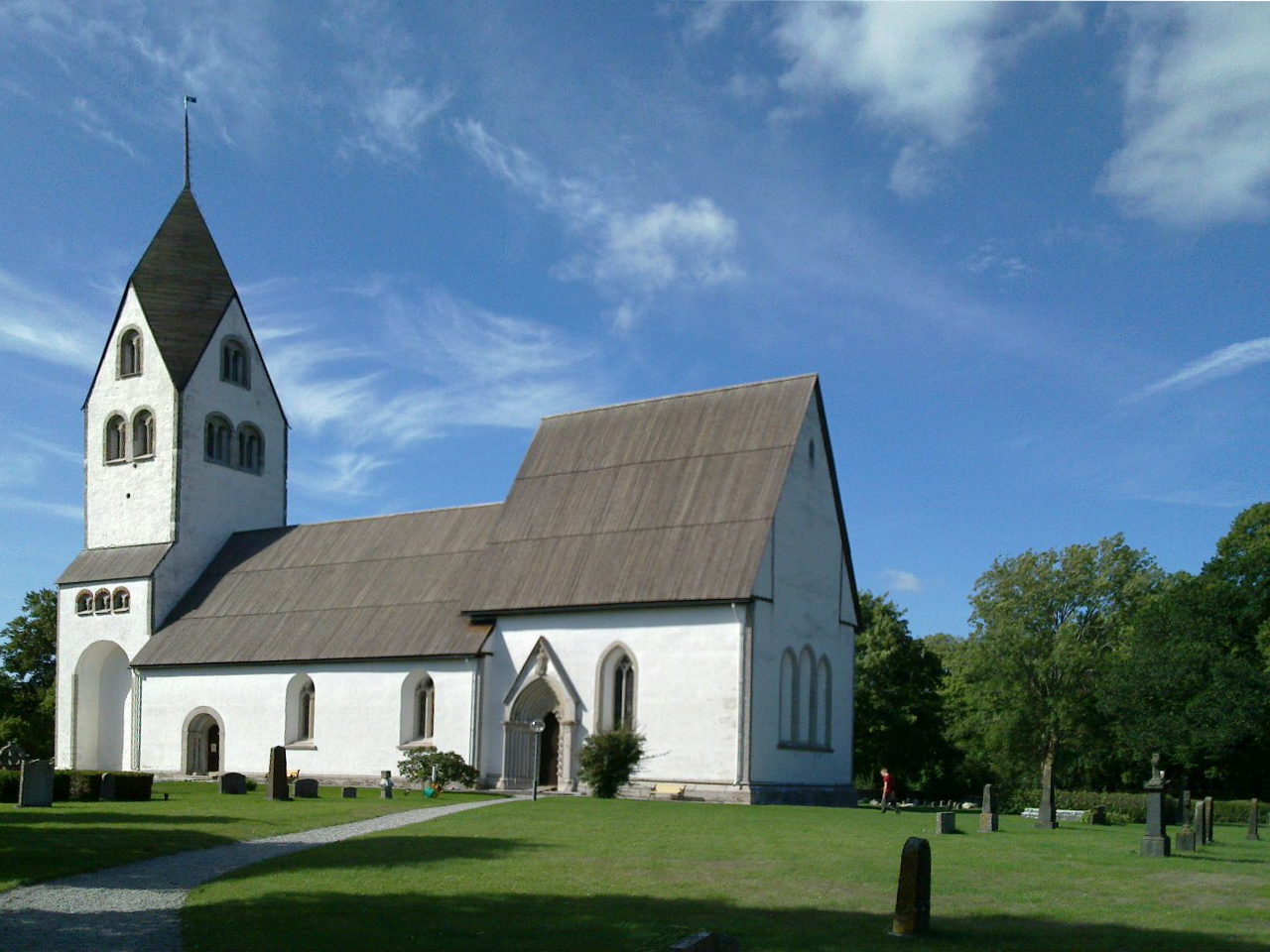
- Burs Church, view of the exterior

- Location on Gotland
- 57°14′44″N 18°30′31″E
- Location: Burs
- Country: Sweden
- Denomination: Church of Sweden

Administration
- Diocese: Visby

Burs Church (Swedish: Burs kyrka) is a medieval church in Burs on the Swedish island of Gotland. The oldest parts of the church is the Romanesque nave, while the large choir is Gothic and richly decorated in the style of the time. Inside, the church has an altarpiece from the 15th century and a Gothic choir stall, among other things.

== History and architecture ==
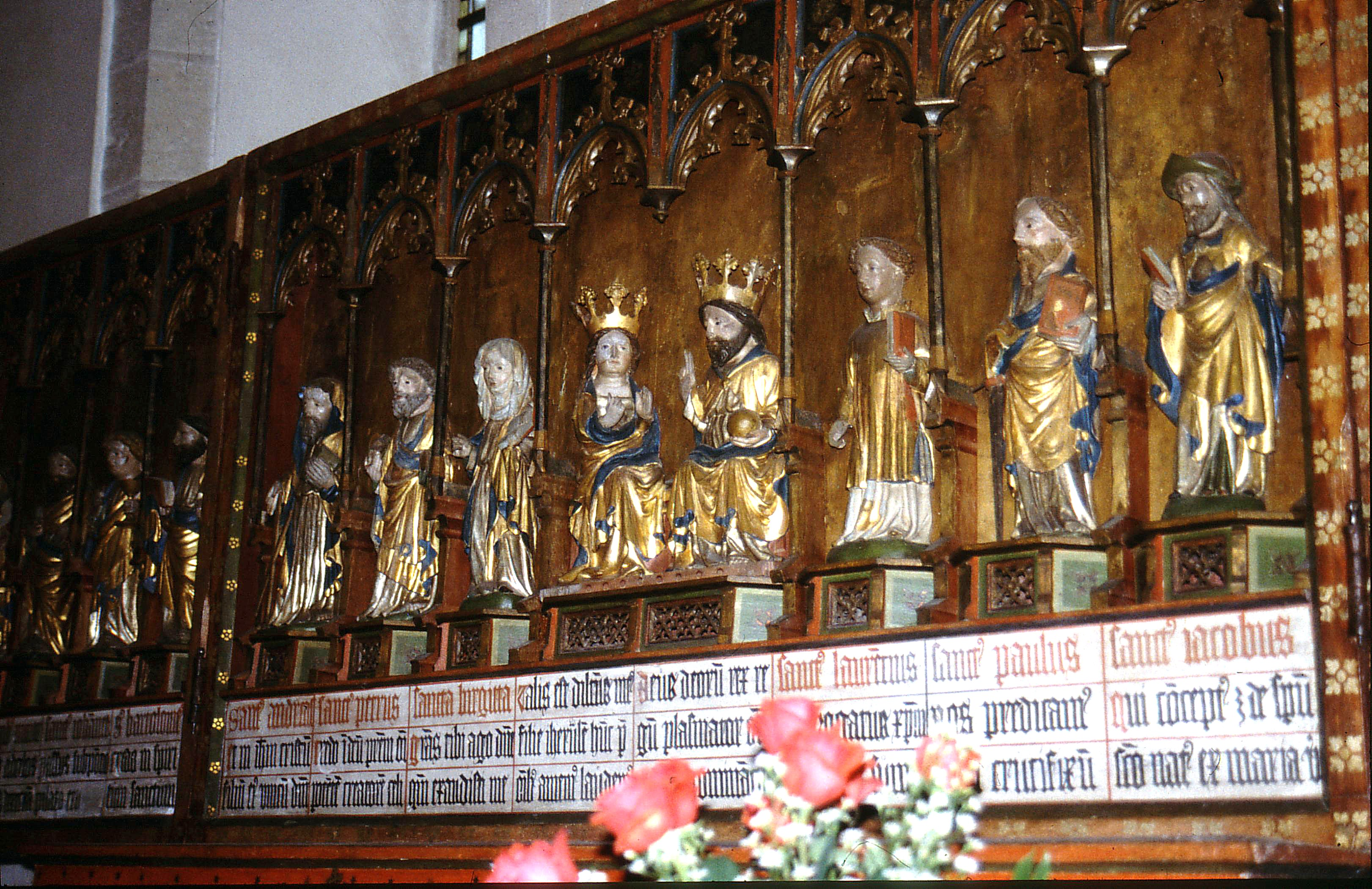
Altarpiece (15th century)

The church in Burs derives its unusual shape from the fact that it was built in stages. It is constructed of plastered limestone. The nave is the oldest part of the church, dating from the early 13th century. The large tower was built in the middle of the same century, while the dis-proportionally large Gothic choir was built a century later, replacing an earlier Romanesque choir and apse.

The choir portal of the church is richly decorated. The doorway displays Gothic sculptures depicting a blessing of Christ, apostles and saints, as well as a large frieze spanning the whole of the portal, depicting the Parable of the Ten Virgins. The choir, and hence the choir portal, was probably built by a stonemasons' workshop sometimes referred to as Egypticus, which was active on Gotland during 1330–1380. The same workshop probably made an unusual, elaborate carved limestone choir bench inside the church, on which traces of original paint are still visible.

The interior is spacious and airy. Of furnishings, the altarpiece has been described as an unusually accomplished work of art made in Lübeck or northern Germany during the first half of the 15th century. The church also has a triumphal cross from the 13th century, traces of medieval stained glass paintings and several pieces if furnishings which are later, dating from the 18th century.

The church was thoroughly renovated in 1960–1964.

Burs Church belongs to the Diocese of Visby of the Church of Sweden.
