= Bysen =

Legendary creature from Swedish folklore

Bysen (Swedish pronunciation: [ˈby̌ːsɛn]) is a legendary gnome-like creature that haunts the woods of the island of Gotland, Sweden.

Bysen carries an axe. He is said to have committed a crime and condemned to walk the Earth forever. He attracts people, making them get lost. Often he meddles with foresters, delays their transports, and tips loads of timber over. He often interferes with men in other ways and is accused of all sorts of mischief. Bysen often appears as a stump or an insignificant, little, grey man. Sometimes he wears a red woven cap and an axe because one of his tasks is to cut down Gotland's forest. This goes slowly, however, and sometimes only one tree per century is felled. It's said Bysen is a humanoid who has done some crime within his lifetime and is therefore sentenced to wander the Earth forever. Bysen is also the ward of the forest and nature.

Similar to the Deildegast from Norwegian folklore, some sources say that Bysen are deceased people who have cheated other men out of their land by moving the markers that separated two holdings. As punishment, they get no peace in the grave and are doomed to go along the faulty border, moving the sticks on the wrong land. As they walk, you can hear them mumble, "This is right, this is wrong", while moving the markers. If a human follows Bysen and moves the wrongly placed sticks to the right places, then Bysen will gain peace. On the Swedish mainland the counterpart to Bysen is called skälvrängare or osaliga lantmätare (approximately: unholy landsurveyor).

If Bysen catches sight of you where you are in the forest, he will enchant your vision so that you can not find him again. What returns one's vision to normal is to turn a garment crooked.

== Etymology and spelling ==
The word bys most likely comes from the Swedish word bus, which means mischief or prank.

Its declinations in Swedish with English translations:

singular form with indefinite article	plural form	definite form with article	definite plural form
en bys	bysar	bysen	bysarna
"a bys"	"bysar"	"the bys"	"the bysar"
