= Stånga Games =

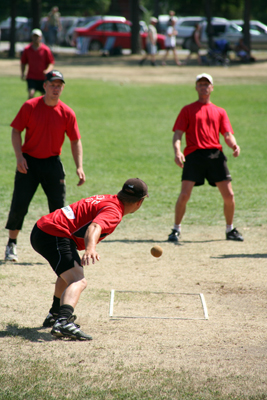
Stånga Games (2006)

The Stånga Games (in Swedish Stångaspelen), also referred to as the "Gotland Olympic Games", is an annual sports competition in Stånga on the Swedish island of Gotland. The first Stånga Games were held on 27 July 1924. The games are held during five days around the second weekend in July and gathers about 2000 participants. Competitions are held in various Gutnish disciplines, some dating back to the Viking Age.

== History ==
The first competition was held in 1882. From the late 1880s, general Gotland athletics competitions were held several times per decade. In 1912, a special association was formed - "Föreningen Gotländsk Idrott" (FGI) with the mission of promoting the Gotland sports games. In 1924, FGI decided to arrange a Gothic sport competition in Stånga. Reinhold Dahlgren (1886-1968), a high school teacher from Östergarn organized the competition annually starting 1933 calling it officially Stångaspelen. The Stånga municipality gave the games a central location in Stånga with the new Stangmalmen racing stadium ready for competition in 1956.

When Reinhold Dahlgren retired at the age of 75, his sons Tore Dahlgren (1914-1973) and Anders Dahlgren (1924-1997) took over the responsibility of organizing the games.

== Sports ==
- Varpa
- Pärk
- Caber toss
- Gutnish pentathlon
- Pillow fight on a pole (Herre på stång)
- Leg hook (Rövkrok)
- Hobble kick (Sparka Bleistre)
- Tug of war, eight-man teams (Dragkamp)
- Two-men tug of war, facing (Att dra hank)
- Two-men tug of war, back to back (Att täme stäut)

== MVPs ==
Year, Team, Player

- 1924 När I - Valfred Nilsson
- 1925 Hablingbo BK - Karl Hansson
- 1926 Slite IF - Brynolf Wahlén
- 1927 När IF - Valfred Nilsson
- 1928 När - Valfred Nilsson
- 1929 Lau - John Larsson
- 1930 Stånga IF - Erik Lundgren
- 1931 Lau - John Larsson
- 1932 Burs IF - Gottfrid Nilsson
- 1933 Lau I - John Larsson
- 1934 Burs IF - Gottfrid Nilsson
- 1935 Stånga - Erik Lundgren
- 1936 Burs - Gottfrid Nilsson
- 1937 Burs - Fritz Pettersson
- 1938 Gothem - Johannes Arweson
- 1939 När II - Hugo Gardell
- 1940 No games held
- 1941 När II - Hugo Gardell
- 1942 När II - Hugo Gardell
- 1943 Hablingbo - Manne Boberg
- 1944 Hablingbo - Manne Boberg
- 1945 När I - Ivar Häglund
- 1946 När I - Ivar Häglund
- 1947 När - Ture Häglund
- 1948 Burs - Albert Alvengren
- 1949 Burs - Albert Alvengren
- 1950 Gothem - Henning Gahnström
- 1951 Gothem - Henning Gahnström
- 1952 Silte - Erik Hedin
- 1953 När - Bertil Schüberg
- 1954 Silte - Erik Hedin
- 1955 No games held
- 1956 När - Allan Nilsson, Alvare
- 1957 När - Allan Nilsson, Alvare
- 1958 När II - Arne Ohlsson
- 1959 När - Allan Nilsson, Alvare
- 1960 Lau I - Allan Larsson
- 1961 Lau I - Allan Larsson
- 1962 Lau I - Allan Larsson
- 1963 När - Allan Nilsson, Alvare
- 1964 När - Allan Nilsson, Alvare
- 1965 När - Allan Nilsson, Alvare
- 1966 När - Allan Nilsson, Alvare
- 1967 När - Allan Nilsson, Alvare
- 1968 Lau I - Allan Larsson
- 1969 Lau I - Allan Larsson
- 1970 När - Allan Nilsson, Alvare
- 1971 När II - Bengt-Rune Nilsson
- 1972 Lau I - Allan Larsson
- 1973 Silte - Erik Hedin
- 1974 När - Allan Nilsson, Alvare
- 1975 När - Allan Nilsson, Alvare
- 1976 När II - Bengt-Rune Nilsson
- 1977 Vallstena I - Rune Larsson
- 1978 Vallstena I - Rune Larsson
- 1979 Lau III - Torgny Larsson
- 1980 Lau III - Torgny Larsson
- 1981 Lau III - Torgny Larsson
- 1982 När IV - Torsten Smitterberg
- 1983 Lau III - Torgny Larsson
- 1984 Lau III - Torgny Larsson
- 1985 Lau III - Torgny Larsson
- 1986 Lau III - Torgny Larsson
- 1987 Lau III - Torgny Larsson
- 1988 Gothem II - Michael Olofsson
- 1989 Lau III - Torgny Larsson
- 1990 När III - Jaan Nilsson
- 1991 Gothem II - Michael Olofsson
- 1992 Gothem II - Michael Olofsson
- 1993 Stånga IV - Björn Ekman
- 1994 Stånga IV - Björn Ekman
- 1995 När III - Jaan Nilsson
- 1996 Stånga IV - Björn Ekman
- 1997 Hablingbo II - Johan Mattsson
- 1998 Hablingbo II - Johan Mattsson
- 1999 Hablingbo II - Johan Mattsson
- 2000 När III - Jaan Nilsson
- 2001 Hablingbo II - Johan Mattsson
- 2002 Hablingbo II - Johan Mattsson
- 2003 Hablingbo II - Johan Mattsson
- 2004 Hablingbo II - Johan Mattsson
- 2005 Hablingbo II - Johan Mattsson
- 2006 Hablingbo II - Johan Mattsson
- 2007 Hablingbo II - Johan Mattsson
- 2008 Hablingbo II - Johan Mattsson
- 2009 Hablingbo II - Johan Mattsson
- 2010 Hablingbo II - Johan Mattsson
- 2011 Hablingbo II - Johan Mattsson
- 2012 Lau I - Arvid Larsson
- 2013 Lau I - Arvid Larsson
- 2014 Lau I - Arvid Larsson
- 2015 Lau I - Arvid Larsson
- 2016 Lau I - Arvid Larsson
- 2017 Lau I - Arvid Larsson

== Bibliography ==
- Mattsson, Anders (1999). Stångaspelen 75 år Visby: Fören. Gutnisk idrott. (ISBN 91-85716-82-0)
