= Pelle Swedlund =

Swedish artist (1865–1947)

Per Adolf Swedlund
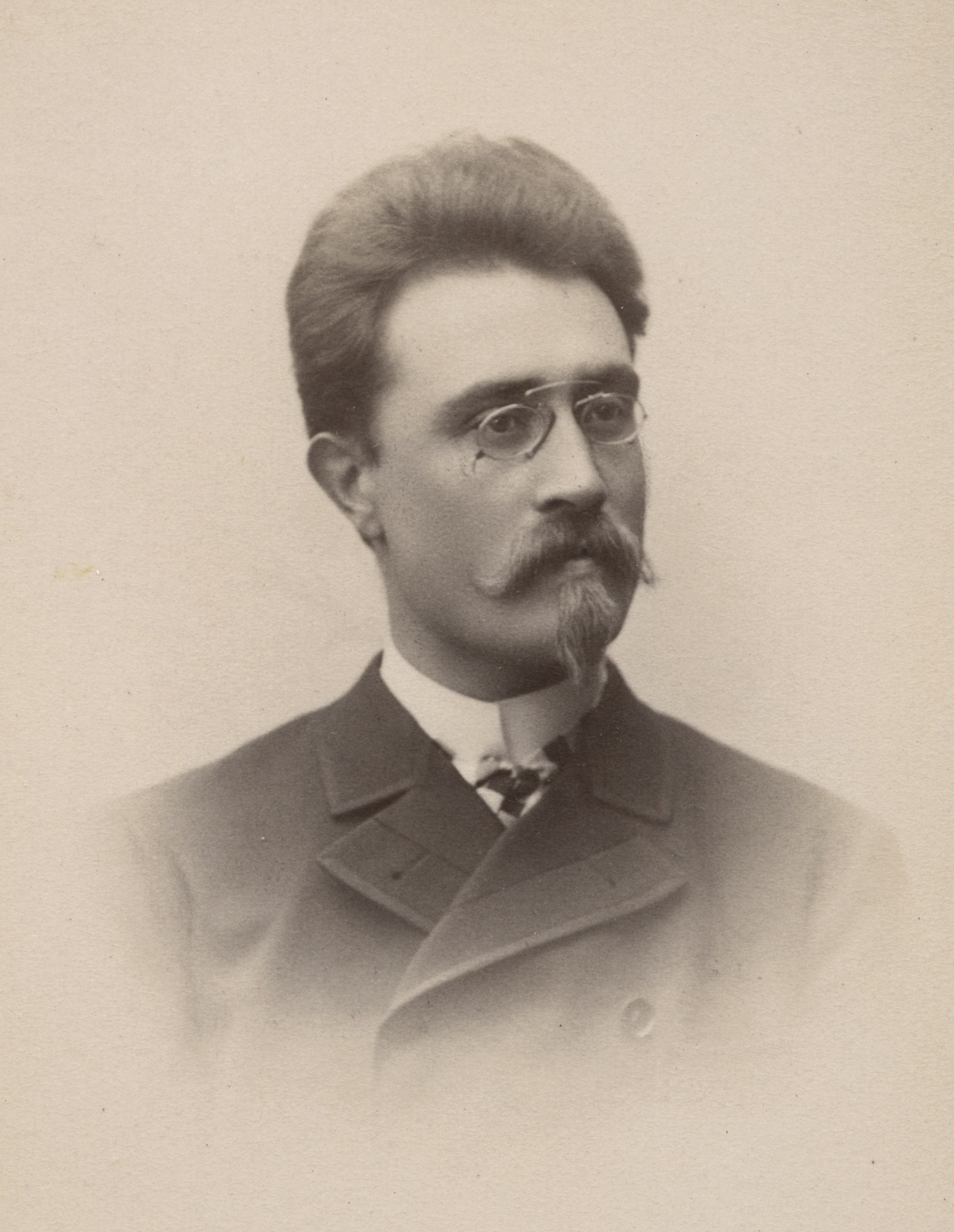
- Born: October 6, 1865; Gävle, Sweden
- Died: February 13, 1947 (aged 81); Stockholm, Sweden
- Other name: Pelle Swedlund
- Occupation: Painter
- Employer: Thiel Gallery (as the curator: 1932-1946)

Per Adolf "Pelle" Swedlund (6 October 1865 – 13 February 1947) was a Swedish artist and painter, known for being also the curator of the Thiel Gallery in Stockholm in the 1930s and 1940s.

== Biography ==
Born in a little town north of the capital Stockholm, he attended the Uppsala University in the mid-1880s and then the Konstakademien in Stockholm. In the 1890s and 1900s he went abroad, from France to Italy, then returning to Sweden and becoming fascinated by the Gotland island, but one of his favorite location was Bruges, in Belgium. He reached a great success already before the start of the 20th century, at a level that on a 1905 newspaper's article one could read that he was moving the painting art forward and making it cosmopolitan with his images of the cityscapes of Bruges, of evening scenes of Italian places.

Swedlund's style was characterized by immense sunsets full of vibrant warm colors, together with more symbolistic and synthetic paintings that were inspired by some other artists like Gustave Moreau and Olof Sager-Nelson (who also painted various scenes from Bruges).

In the later part of his life, from 1932 to 1946 he was the curator of the Thiel Gallery.

=== Private life and family ===
Her sister Tekla (1871–1948), a physical therapist and a school sport coach, introduced basketball in Sweden in 1896.

== Gallery ==
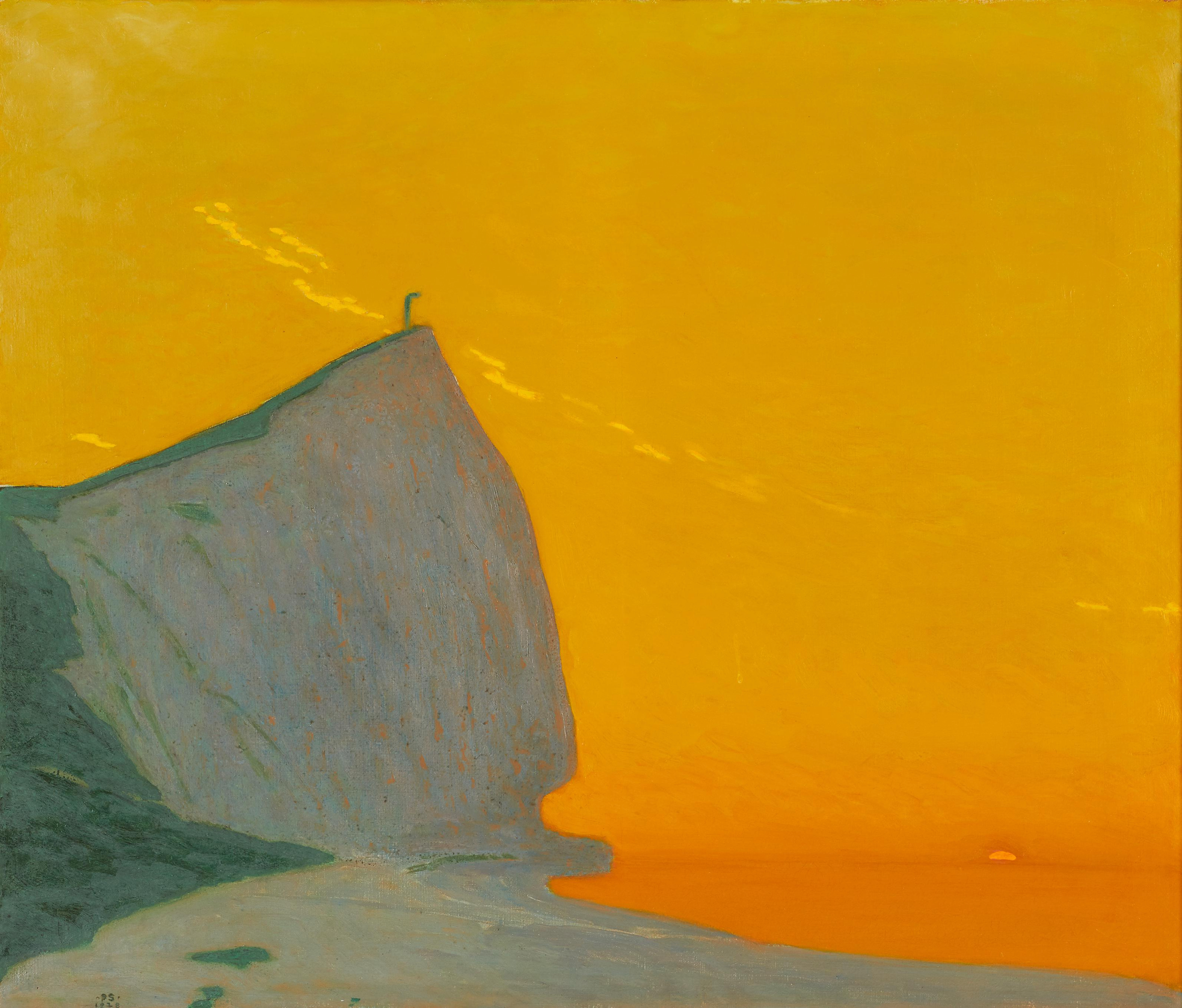
Den ensamme mannen på klippan ("The lonely man on the cliff"), 1928. Place portrayed: Högklint cliff, Gotland island, Sweden.

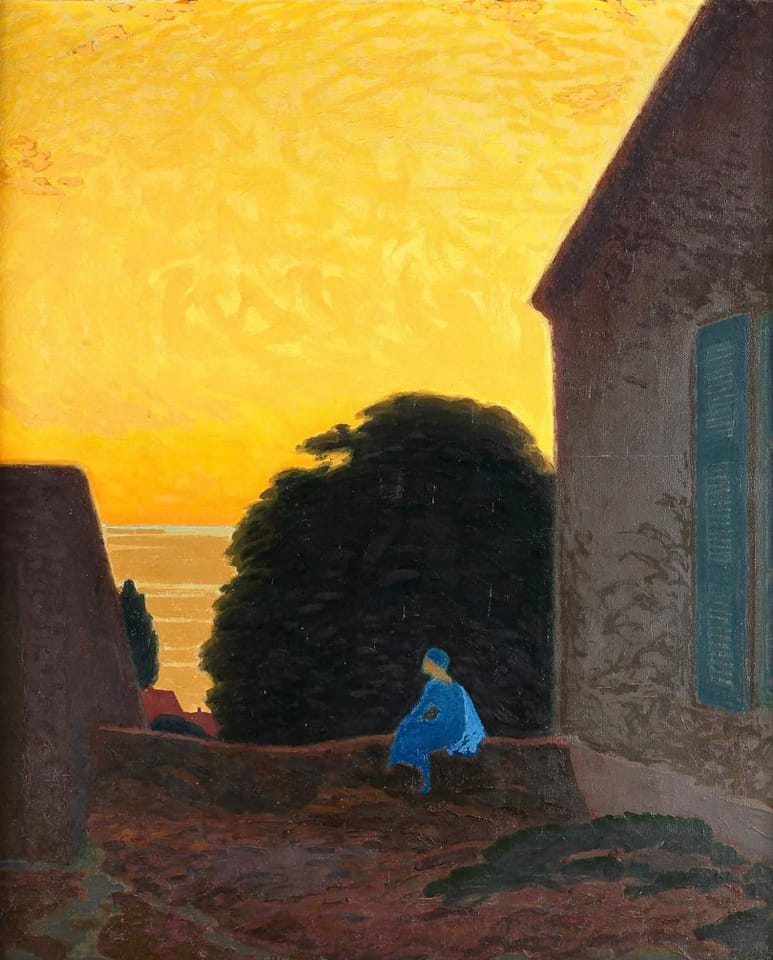
Blå flicka, sommarkväll Visby ("Blue girl, summer evening in Visby"), 1922.

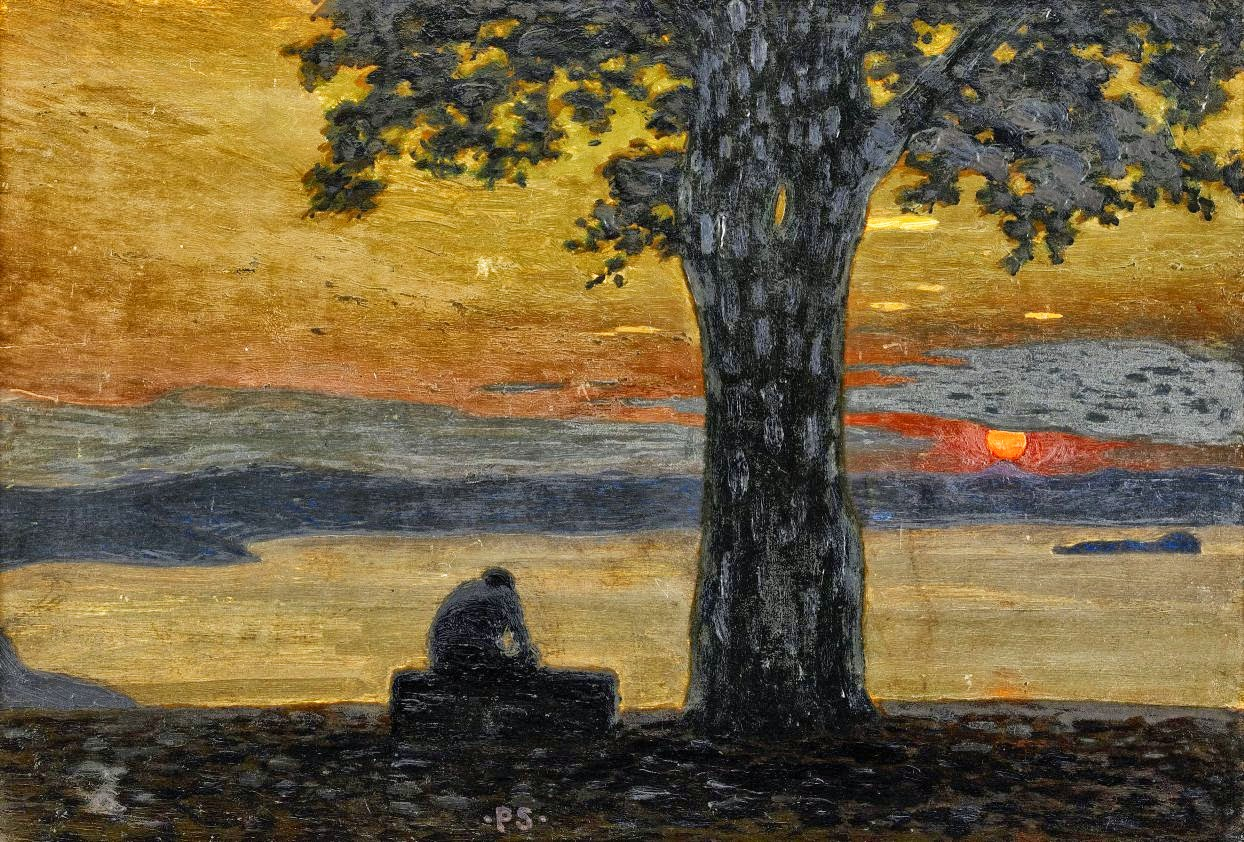
Månskensnatt ("Moonlight night"), unknown date
