= Pärk =

Swedish outdoor sport

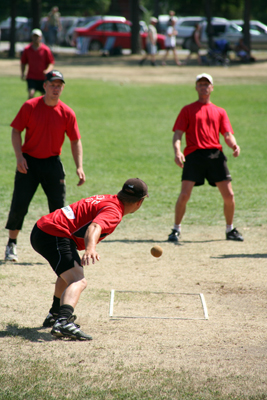
A game of pärk

Pärk or Paerk is a game somewhat similar to a game of baseball but where the aim is to gain ground like in American football, that has been played for centuries on the island of Gotland in Baltic Sea. The game is played with two teams of 7 people on a field that is 30 m (98 ft) wide and that can vary in length. The players hit the ball with their hands or feet. The paerk, or serve area, is marked off with wooden laths and measures 2.1 m × 0.7 m (6.9 ft × 2.3 ft).

The ball is made of a tight ball of yarn that has been dressed in sheepskin.

Pärk is one of the disciplines at the annual Stånga Games (Stångaspelen).

== See also ==
- Varpa
