= Deildegast =

Type of ghost in Norwegian folklore

In Norwegian folklore, a deildegast is a type of ghost connected with the sanctity of boundary stones, and what happened to those who dared to move them. The deildegast-tradition was most prevalent in the southern parts of Norway and is also connected to the gjenganger phenomenon.

A deildegast, it was said, does not receive peace in the afterlife as a result of enlarging his own territory while alive by moving the boundary stones dividing his own and his neighbour's territory. After dying, the deildegast was forced to haunt the area near the boundary stones until he was able to lift it back to its correct place. This feat proved impossible, however, as the stone would always slip, causing the deildegast to emit a sorrowful scream before trying again to no avail.

== Etymology ==
In Norwegian, "gast" approximately means "ghost", but ghosts in Norwegian and Scandinavian folklore differ greatly from the modern perception of ghosts, often having a corporeal body and being violent in nature. "Deild" is an archaic word for "border-stone". The approximate translation of deildegast then, is "border-stone ghost".

== Description ==
The first mention of a deildegast in literature comes from Draumkvedet, written near the end of the Middle Ages. The belief itself quite likely predates this (and is documented by the Draumkvedet), though no proof exists.

The deildegast was also said to be able to transform into a bird, most often an owl, called ghost (gasten) by the local people. In human form the deildegast looked like a normal human, except for his clothes. Often having died many years ago, the deildegast wore the clothes of its own days, which often meant that they looked very outdated to those that saw it.

As a social phenomenon, the deildegast served different social functions. The threat of becoming a deildegast deterred any attempt at tampering with border stones, keeping land disputes under control. It might also have prevented people who suspected that their border stones had been moved from enacting physical revenge on their neighbours, in safe knowledge that they would get their metaphysical revenge when the wrong-doer died.

== See also ==
- Deildegasten Ridge

== Bibliography ==
- Hodne, Ørnulf (1995) Vetter og skrømt i norsk folketro (J.W. Cappelens forlag ) ISBN 978-8202154967
- Sivertsen, Birger (2000) For noen troll (Andresen & Butenschøn) ISBN 9788276940701
