= Varpa =

Swedish outdoor sport

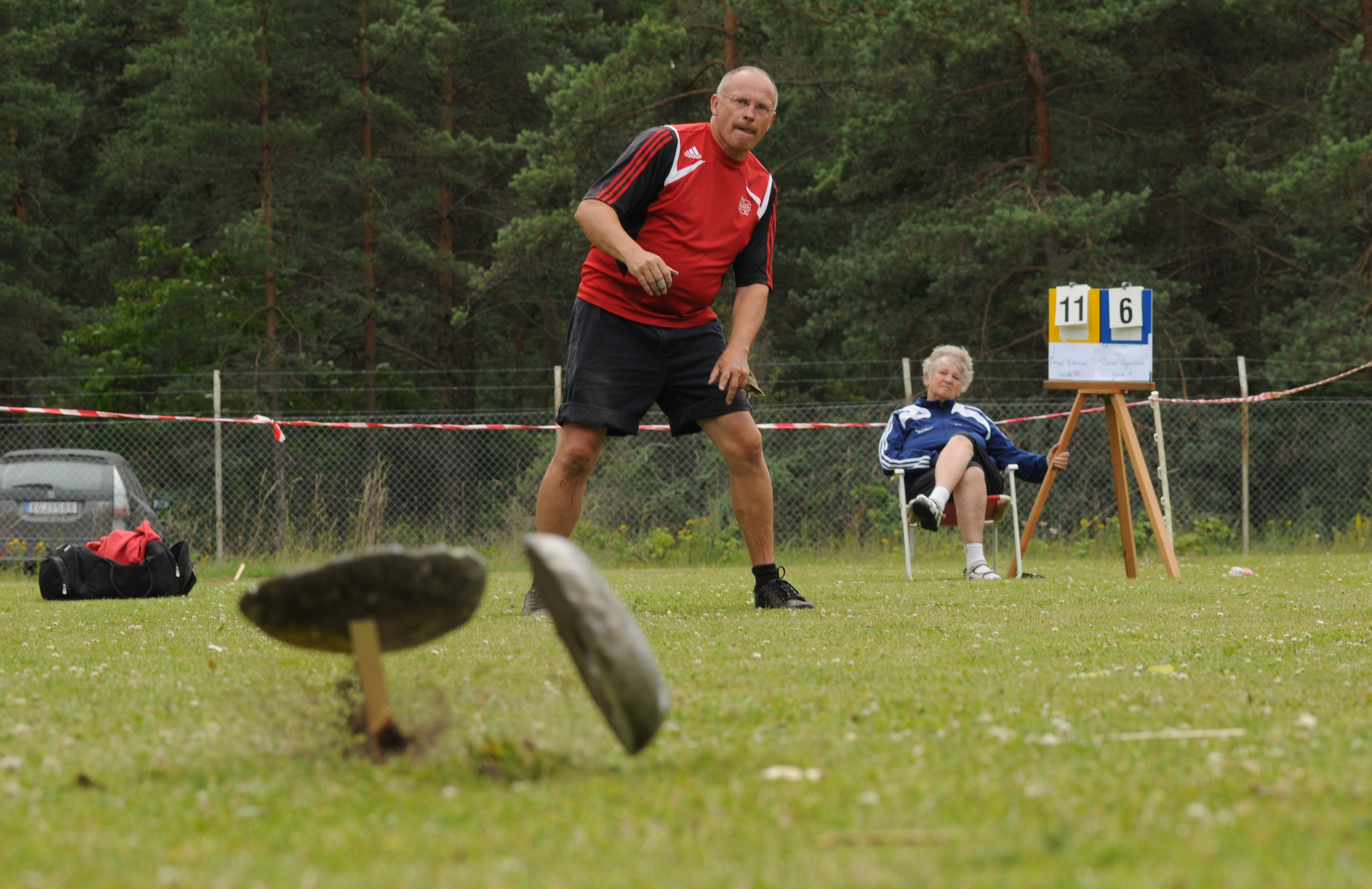
Varpa, Stånga Games, Gotland.

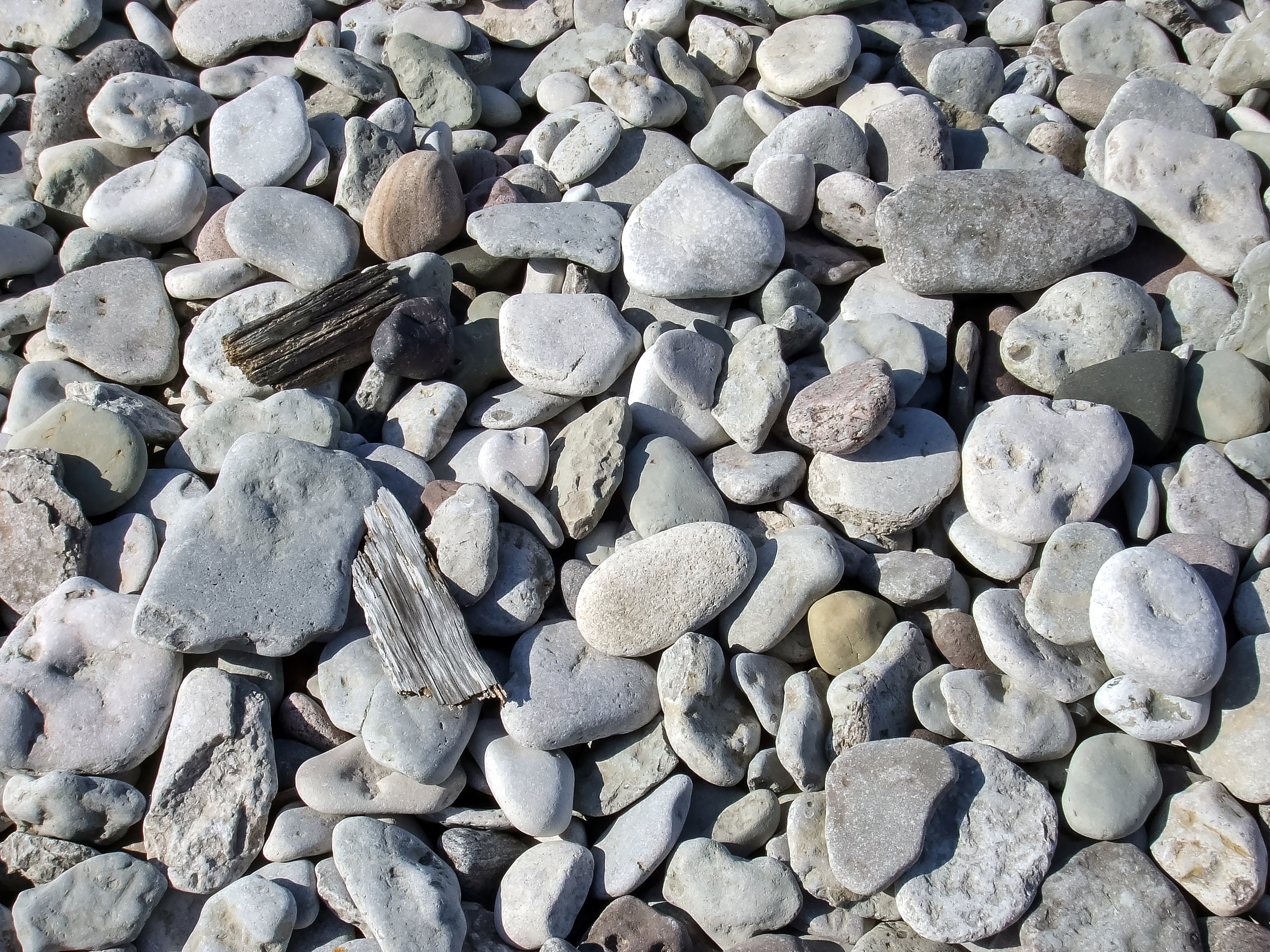
Flat limestones from Gotland's beaches, tumbled and rounded by the sea, are the original varpa stones used in the game

Varpa is an outdoor game of physical skill that allegedly dates back to the Viking Age and survived in Gotland. It is similar to boules and horseshoes but is played with a flat and heavy object called a "varpa" instead of balls. Varpas used to be well-shaped stones, but nowadays, aluminium is more popular. A varpa can weigh between one-half and five kilograms (one and eleven pounds). The object of the game is to throw the varpa as close to a stick as possible. The stick is fifteen metres (sixteen yards) away for women and twenty metres (twenty-two yards) away for men. The game can be played individually or in teams.

No official nationally sponsored varpa teams exist; however, unofficial leagues are growing in popularity among youth in suburban areas of Sweden and Norway.

"Varpa" is an old word which simply means "to throw".

Varpa is one of the disciplines at the annual Stånga Games (Stångaspelen).

== See also ==
- Caber toss
