= List of Corydalis species =

The following species in the flowering plant genus Corydalis are accepted by Plants of the World Online. A large, highly variable genus, a molecular study using plastid and nuclear DNA shows that its over 530 species are divided into four subgenera and 39 sections.

- Corydalis aconitiflora Lidén
- Corydalis acropteryx Fedde
- Corydalis acuminata Franch.
- Corydalis adiantifolia Hook.f. & Thomson
- Corydalis adoxifolia C.Y.Wu
- Corydalis adunca Maxim.
- Corydalis aeaeae X.F.Gao, Lidén, Y.W.Wang & Y.L.Peng
- Corydalis aeditua Lidén & Z.Y.Su
- Corydalis afghanica Gilli
- Corydalis ainae (Rukšāns ex Lidén) Lazkov & Sennikov
- Corydalis aitchisonii Popov
- Corydalis alaschanica (Maxim.) Peschkova
- Corydalis albipetala B.U.Oh
- Corydalis alexeenkoana N.Busch
- Corydalis alpestris C.A.Mey.
- Corydalis amarnathiana Dar, Semi & Naqshi
- Corydalis ambigua Cham. & Schltdl.
- Corydalis ampelos Lidén & Z.Y.Su
- Corydalis amphipogon Lidén
- Corydalis amplisepala Z.Y.Su & Lidén
- Corydalis anaginova Lidén & Z.Y.Su
- Corydalis ananke Lidén
- Corydalis anethifolia C.Y.Wu & Z.Y.Su
- Corydalis angusta Z.Y.Su & Lidén
- Corydalis angustifolia (M.Bieb.) DC.
- Corydalis anthocrene Lidén & Van De Veire
- Corydalis anthriscifolia Franch.
- Corydalis appendiculata Hand.-Mazz.
- Corydalis aquilegioides Z.Y.Su
- Corydalis arctica Popov
- Corydalis arcuata M.K.Pathak, Chowlu, B.Saikia & Lidén
- Corydalis atuntsuensis W.W.Sm.
- Corydalis aurantiaca Ludlow & Stearn
- Corydalis aurea Willd.
- Corydalis auricilla Lidén & Z.Y.Su
- Corydalis auriculata Lidén & Z.Y.Su
- Corydalis austroshaanxiensis D.Wang
- Corydalis baekunnensis Y.N.Lee
- Corydalis balansae Prain
- Corydalis balsamiflora Prain
- Corydalis barbisepala Hand.-Mazz. & Fedde
- Corydalis begljanovae Stepanov
- Corydalis benecincta W.W.Sm.
- Corydalis bibracteolata Z.Y.Su
- Corydalis biflora Lidén, M.K.Pathak, Chowlu & B.Saikia
- Corydalis bijiangensis C.Y.Wu & H.Chuang
- Corydalis bimaculata C.Y.Wu & T.Y.Shu
- Corydalis birmanica Lidén
- Corydalis blanda Schott
- Corydalis bombylina Stepanov
- Corydalis bonghwaensis M.Kim & H.Jo
- Corydalis borii C.E.C.Fisch.
- Corydalis bosbutooensis Lazkov
- Corydalis brachyceras Lidén & Van De Veire
- Corydalis bracteata (Stephan ex Willd.) Pers.
- Corydalis brevipedicellata Lidén
- Corydalis brevirostrata C.Y.Wu & T.Y.Shu
- Corydalis brunneovaginata Fedde
- Corydalis bucharica Popov
- Corydalis × budensis Vojda
- Corydalis bulbifera C.Y.Wu
- Corydalis bulbilligera Z.Y.Wu
- Corydalis bulleyana Diels
- Corydalis bungeana Turcz.
- Corydalis buschii Nakai
- Corydalis calcarea Albov
- Corydalis calliantha D.G.Long
- Corydalis calycina Lidén
- Corydalis calycosa X.Zhuang
- Corydalis campulicarpa Hayata
- Corydalis capillipes Franch.
- Corydalis capitata X.F.Gao, Lidén, Y.W.Wang & Y.L.Peng
- Corydalis capnoides (L.) Pers.
- Corydalis caput-medusae Z.Y.Su & Lidén
- Corydalis carinata Lidén & Z.Y.Su
- Corydalis caseana A.Gray
- Corydalis cashmeriana Royle
- Corydalis casimiriana Duthie & Prain
- Corydalis cataractarum Lidén
- Corydalis caucasica DC.
- Corydalis caudata (Lam.) Pers.
- Corydalis cava (L.) Schweigg. & Körte
- Corydalis cavei D.G.Long
- Corydalis chaerophylla DC.
- Corydalis chamdoensis C.Y.Wu & H.Chuang
- Corydalis changuensis D.G.Long
- Corydalis cheilanthifolia Hemsl.
- Corydalis cheilosticta Z.Y.Su & Lidén
- Corydalis cheirifolia Franch.
- Corydalis chihuahuana Fedde
- Corydalis chingii Fedde
- Corydalis chionophila Czerniak.
- Corydalis chrysosphaera Marquand & Airy Shaw
- Corydalis clarkei Prain
- Corydalis clavibracteata Ludlow & Stearn
- Corydalis clematis H.Lév.
- Corydalis cofouensis H.Lév.
- Corydalis conorhiza Ledeb.
- Corydalis conspersa Maxim.
- Corydalis cornuta Royle
- Corydalis corymbosa C.Y.Wu & T.Y.Shu
- Corydalis crassifolia Royle
- Corydalis crispa Prain
- Corydalis crista-galli Maxim.
- Corydalis cristata Maxim.
- Corydalis crithmifolia Royle
- Corydalis cryptogama Z.Y.Su & Lidén
- Corydalis crystallina (Torr. & A.Gray) Engelm. ex A.Gray
- Corydalis curvicalcarata Miyabe & T.C.Ku
- Corydalis curviflora Maxim. ex Hemsl.
- Corydalis curvisiliqua (A.Gray) Engelm. ex A.Gray
- Corydalis cytisiflora (Fedde) Lidén ex C.Y.Wu, H.Chuang & Z.Y.Su
- Corydalis dajingensis C.Y.Wu & T.Y.Shu
- Corydalis darwasica Regel ex Prain
- Corydalis dasyptera Maxim.
- Corydalis dautica Mikhailova
- Corydalis davidii Franch.
- Corydalis decumbens (Thunb.) Pers.
- Corydalis degensis C.Y.Wu & H.Chuang
- Corydalis delavayi Franch.
- Corydalis delicatula D.G.Long
- Corydalis delphinioides Fedde
- Corydalis densiflora C.Presl
- Corydalis densispica C.Y.Wu
- Corydalis devendrae Pusalkar
- Corydalis diffusa Lidén
- Corydalis diphylla Wall.
- Corydalis dolichocentra Z.Y.Su & Lidén
- Corydalis dongchuanensis Z.Y.Su & Lidén
- Corydalis dorjii D.G.Long
- Corydalis drakeana Prain
- Corydalis drepanantha D.G.Long
- Corydalis dubia Prain
- Corydalis duclouxii H.Lév. & Vaniot
- Corydalis dulongjiangensis X.Zhuang
- Corydalis duthiei Maxim.
- Corydalis ecristata (Prain) D.G.Long
- Corydalis edulis Maxim.
- Corydalis elata Bureau & Franch.
- Corydalis elegans Wall. ex Hook.f. & Thomson
- Corydalis ellipticarpa C.Y.Wu & Z.Y.Su
- Corydalis emanueli C.A.Mey.
- Corydalis enantiophylla Lidén
- Corydalis erdelii Zucc.
- Corydalis erythrocarpa H.Lév.
- Corydalis esquirolii H.Lév.
- Corydalis eugeniae Fedde
- Corydalis falconeri Hook.f. & Thomson
- Corydalis fangshanensis W.T.Wang
- Corydalis fargesii Franch.
- Corydalis farreri Lidén
- Corydalis feddeana H.Lév.
- Corydalis fedtschenkoana Regel
- Corydalis filicina Prain
- Corydalis filiformis Royle
- Corydalis filisecta C.Y.Wu
- Corydalis filistipes Nakai
- Corydalis fimbrillifera Korsh.
- Corydalis fimbripetala Ludlow & Stearn
- Corydalis flabellata Edgew.
- Corydalis flaccida Hook.f. & Thomson
- Corydalis flavula (Raf.) DC.
- Corydalis flexuosa Franch.
- Corydalis foetida C.Y.Wu & Z.Y.Su
- Corydalis foliaceobracteata C.Y.Wu & Z.Y.Su
- Corydalis franchetiana Prain
- Corydalis fukuharae Lidén
- Corydalis fumariifolia Maxim.
- Corydalis gamosepala Maxim.
- Corydalis gaoxinfeniae Lidén
- Corydalis geraniifolia Hook.f. & Thomson
- Corydalis gigantea Trautv. & C.A.Mey.
- Corydalis giraldii Fedde
- Corydalis glaucescens Regel
- Corydalis glaucissima Lidén & Z.Y.Su
- Corydalis glycyphyllos Fedde
- Corydalis gorinensis V.M.Van
- Corydalis gorodkovii Karav.
- Corydalis gortschakovii Schrenk ex Fisch. & C.A.Mey.
- Corydalis gotlandica Lidén
- Corydalis gouldii Lidén
- Corydalis govaniana Wall.
- Corydalis gracilis Ledeb.
- Corydalis gracillima C.Y.Wu ex Govaerts
- Corydalis grandicalyx B.U.Oh & Y.S.Kim
- Corydalis grandiflora C.Y.Wu & Z.Y.Su
- Corydalis griffithii Boiss.
- Corydalis grubovii Michajlova
- Corydalis gymnopoda Z.Y.Su & Lidén
- Corydalis gypsophila Michajlova
- Corydalis gyrophylla Lidén
- Corydalis halei (Small) Fernald & B.G.Schub.
- Corydalis hallaisanensis H.Lév.
- Corydalis hamata Franch.
- Corydalis hannae Kanitz
- Corydalis harry-smithii Lidén & Z.Y.Su
- Corydalis × hausmannii Klebelsberg
- Corydalis haussknechtii Lidén
- Corydalis hebephylla C.Y.Wu & Z.Y.Su
- Corydalis hegangensis W.T.Wang
- Corydalis helodes Lidén & Van De Veire
- Corydalis hemidicentra Hand.-Mazz.
- Corydalis hemsleyana Franch. & Prain
- Corydalis hendersonii Hemsl.
- Corydalis henrikii Lidén
- Corydalis hepaticifolia C.Y.Wu & T.Y.Shu
- Corydalis heracleifolia C.Y.Wu & Z.Y.Su
- Corydalis heterocarpa Siebold & Zucc.
- Corydalis heterocentra Diels
- Corydalis heterodonta H.Lév.
- Corydalis heteropetala Ochiauri
- Corydalis heterophylla Michajlova
- Corydalis heterothylax C.Y.Wu ex Z.Y.Su & Lidén
- Corydalis hindukushensis Wendelbo & Grey-Wilson
- Corydalis homopetala Diels
- Corydalis hongbashanensis Lidén & Y.W.Wang
- Corydalis hookeri Prain
- Corydalis hsiaowutaishanensis T.P.Wang
- Corydalis hualongshanensis D.Wang
- Corydalis huangshanensis L.Q.Huang & H.S.Peng
- Corydalis humicola Hand.-Mazz.
- Corydalis humilis B.U.Oh & Y.S.Kim
- Corydalis humosa Migo
- Corydalis imbricata Z.Y.Su & Lidén
- Corydalis impatiens (Pall.) Fisch. ex DC.
- Corydalis incisa (Thunb.) Pers.
- Corydalis inconspicua Bunge ex Ledeb.
- Corydalis inopinata Prain ex Fedde
- Corydalis integra Barbey & Fors.-Major
- Corydalis intermedia (L.) Mérat
- Corydalis iochanensis H.Lév.
- Corydalis ischnosiphon Lidén & Z.Y.Su
- Corydalis jigmei C.E.C.Fisch. & Kaul
- Corydalis jingyuanensis C.Y.Wu & H.Chuang
- Corydalis jiulongensis Z.Y.Su & Lidén
- Corydalis juncea Wall.
- Corydalis kailiensis Z.Y.Su
- Corydalis kashgarica Rupr.
- Corydalis khasiana Lidén
- Corydalis kiautschouensis Poelln.
- Corydalis kingdonis Airy Shaw
- Corydalis kingii Prain
- Corydalis kiukiangensis C.Y.Wu, Z.Y.Su & Lidén
- Corydalis kokiana Hand.-Mazz.
- Corydalis kovakensis Michajlova
- Corydalis krasnovii Michajlova
- Corydalis kuruchuensis Lidén
- Corydalis kushiroensis Fukuhara
- Corydalis lacrimuli-cuculi Stepanov
- Corydalis laelia Prain
- Corydalis lagochila Lidén & Z.Y.Su
- Corydalis lasiocarpa Lidén & Z.Y.Su
- Corydalis lathyroides Prain
- Corydalis lathyrophylla C.Y.Wu
- Corydalis latiflora Hook.f. & Thomson
- Corydalis latilepidota W.T.Wang
- Corydalis latiloba (Franch.) Hand.-Mazz.
- Corydalis laucheana Fedde
- Corydalis × laxa Fr.
- Corydalis laxiflora Lidén
- Corydalis ledebouriana Kar. & Kir.
- Corydalis leptantha Lidén
- Corydalis leptocarpa Hook.f. & Thomson
- Corydalis leptophylla Lidén
- Corydalis leucanthema C.Y.Wu
- Corydalis lhasaensis C.Y.Wu & Z.Y.Su
- Corydalis lhorongensis C.Y.Wu & H.Chuang
- Corydalis liana Lidén & Z.Y.Su
- Corydalis linarioides Maxim.
- Corydalis lineariloba Siebold & Zucc.
- Corydalis linearis C.Y.Wu
- Corydalis linjiangensis Z.Y.Su
- Corydalis linstowiana Fedde
- Corydalis livida Maxim.
- Corydalis longibracteata Ludlow & Stearn
- Corydalis longicalcarata H.Chuang & Z.Y.Su
- Corydalis longicornu Franch.
- Corydalis longipes DC.
- Corydalis longistyla Z.Y.Su & Lidén
- Corydalis longkiensis C.Y.Wu, Lidén & Z.Y.Su
- Corydalis lophophora Lidén & Z.Y.Su
- Corydalis lopinensis Franch.
- Corydalis lowndesii Lidén
- Corydalis ludlowii Stearn
- Corydalis lupinoides Marquand & Airy Shaw
- Corydalis luquanensis H.Chuang
- Corydalis lydica Lidén
- Corydalis macrocalyx Litv.
- Corydalis macrocentra Regel
- Corydalis maculata B.U.Oh & Y.S.Kim
- Corydalis madida Lidén & Z.Y.Su
- Corydalis magadanica A.P.Khokhr.
- Corydalis magni Pusalkar
- Corydalis mairei H.Lév.
- Corydalis maracandica Michajlova
- Corydalis mayae Hand.-Mazz.
- Corydalis mediterranea Z.Y.Su & Lidén
- Corydalis megacalyx Ludlow & Stearn
- Corydalis megalosperma Z.Y.Su
- Corydalis meifolia Wall.
- Corydalis melanochlora Maxim.
- Corydalis meyori Lidén, R.Mili & B.Saikia
- Corydalis micrantha (Engelm. ex A.Gray) A.Gray ex J.M.Coult.
- Corydalis microflora (C.Y.Wu & H.Chuang) Z.Y.Su & Lidén
- Corydalis microphylla Michajlova
- Corydalis microsperma Lidén
- Corydalis milarepa Lidén & Z.Y.Su
- Corydalis mildbraedii Fedde
- Corydalis minutiflora C.Y.Wu
- Corydalis mira (Batalin) C.Y.Wu & H.Chuang
- Corydalis moorcroftiana Wall. ex Hook.f. & Thomson
- Corydalis moupinensis Franch.
- Corydalis mucronata Franch.
- Corydalis mucronifera Maxim.
- Corydalis mucronipetala (C.Y.Wu & H.Chuang) Lidén & Z.Y.Su
- Corydalis muliensis C.Y.Wu & Z.Y.Su
- Corydalis multiflora Michajlova
- Corydalis murgabica Michajlova
- Corydalis myriophylla Lidén
- Corydalis nana Royle
- Corydalis nanchuanensis S.R.Yi
- Corydalis nanwutaishanensis Z.Y.Su & Lidén
- Corydalis nematopoda Lidén & Z.Y.Su
- Corydalis nemoralis C.Y.Wu & H.Chuang
- Corydalis nidus-serpentis Stepanov
- Corydalis nigroapiculata C.Y.Wu
- Corydalis nobilis (L.) Pers.
- Corydalis nodosa Mikhailova
- Corydalis nubicola Z.Y.Su & Lidén
- Corydalis nudicaulis Regel
- Corydalis ochotensis Turcz.
- Corydalis ohii Lidén
- Corydalis oligantha Ludlow & Stearn
- Corydalis oligosperma C.Y.Wu & T.Y.Shu
- Corydalis omeiana (C.Y.Wu & H.Chuang) Z.Y.Su & Lidén
- Corydalis onobrychis Fedde
- Corydalis ophiocarpa Hook.f. & Thomson
- Corydalis oppositifolia DC.
- Corydalis oreocoma Lidén & Z.Y.Su
- Corydalis ornata Lidén & Zetterl.
- Corydalis orthopoda Hayata
- Corydalis oxalidifolia Ludlow & Stearn
- Corydalis oxypetala Franch.
- Corydalis pachycentra Franch.
- Corydalis pachypoda (Franch.) Hand.-Mazz.
- Corydalis paczoskii N.Busch
- Corydalis paeoniifolia (Stephan) Pers.
- Corydalis pakistanica Jafri
- Corydalis pallida Pers.
- Corydalis pallidiflora (Rupr.) N.Busch
- Corydalis panda Lidén & Y.W.Wang
- Corydalis paniculigera Regel & Schmalh.
- Corydalis papillosa Z.Y.Su & Lidén
- Corydalis parviflora Z.Y.Su & Lidén
- Corydalis paschei Lidén
- Corydalis pauciflora (Stephan) Pers.
- Corydalis pauciovulata Ohwi
- Corydalis peltata Lidén & Z.Y.Su
- Corydalis persica Cham. & Schltdl.
- Corydalis petrodoxa Lidén & Z.Y.Su
- Corydalis petrophila Franch.
- Corydalis petroselinifolia H.Lév.
- Corydalis philippi Michajlova
- Corydalis pingwuensis Z.Y.Wu
- Corydalis pinnata Lidén & Z.Y.Su
- Corydalis pinnatibracteata Y.W.Wang, Lidén, Q.R.Liu & M.L.Zhang
- Corydalis platycarpa (Maxim. ex Palib.) Makino
- Corydalis podlechii Lidén
- Corydalis polygalina Hook.f. & Thomson
- Corydalis polyphylla Hand.-Mazz.
- Corydalis popovii Nevski ex Popov
- Corydalis porphyrantha C.Y.Wu
- Corydalis portenieri Mikhailova
- Corydalis potaninii Maxim.
- Corydalis praecipitorum C.Y.Wu, Z.Y.Su & Lidén
- Corydalis prattii Franch.
- Corydalis procera Lidén & Z.Y.Su
- Corydalis pseudimpatiens Fedde
- Corydalis pseudoadoxa C.Y.Wu & H.Chuang
- Corydalis pseudoadunca Popov
- Corydalis pseudoalpestris Popov
- Corydalis pseudoamplisepala D.Wang
- Corydalis pseudobalfouriana Lidén & Z.Y.Su
- Corydalis pseudobarbisepala Fedde
- Corydalis pseudocristata Fedde
- Corydalis pseudodensispica Z.Y.Su & Lidén
- Corydalis pseudodrakeana Lidén
- Corydalis pseudofargesii H.Chuang
- Corydalis pseudofilisecta Lidén & Z.Y.Su
- Corydalis pseudofluminicola Fedde
- Corydalis pseudohemsleyana D.Wang
- Corydalis pseudoincisa C.Y.Wu, Z.Y.Su & Lidén
- Corydalis pseudojuncea Ludlow & Stearn
- Corydalis pseudolongipes Lidén
- Corydalis pseudomairei C.Y.Wu ex Z.Y.Su & Lidén
- Corydalis pseudomicrantha Fedde
- Corydalis pseudomicrophylla Z.Y.Su
- Corydalis pseudomucronata C.Y.Wu, Z.Y.Su & Liden
- Corydalis pseudorupestris Lidén & Z.Y.Su
- Corydalis pseudosibirica Lidén & Z.Y.Su
- Corydalis pseudostricta Popov
- Corydalis pseudotongolensis Lidén
- Corydalis pseudoweigoldii Z.Y.Su
- Corydalis pterygopetala Hand.-Mazz.
- Corydalis pubicaula C.Y.Wu & H.Chuang
- Corydalis pulchella Aitch. & Hemsl.
- Corydalis pumila (Host) Rchb.
- Corydalis punicea C.Y.Wu ex Govaerts
- Corydalis pycnopus Lidén
- Corydalis pygmaea C.Y.Wu & T.Y.Shu
- Corydalis qilianshanica Mikhailova
- Corydalis qinghaiensis Z.Y.Su & Lidén
- Corydalis quantmeyeriana Fedde
- Corydalis quinquefoliolata Ludlow & Stearn
- Corydalis racemosa (Thunb.) Pers.
- Corydalis raddeana Regel
- Corydalis radicans Hand.-Mazz.
- Corydalis rarissima Michajlova
- Corydalis regia Z.Y.Su & Lidén
- Corydalis repens Mandl & Muhldorf
- Corydalis retingensis Ludlow
- Corydalis rheinbabeniana Fedde
- Corydalis rorida H.Chuang
- Corydalis rostellata Lidén
- Corydalis rubrisepala Lidén
- Corydalis ruksansii Lidén
- Corydalis rupestris Kotschy
- Corydalis rupifraga C.Y.Wu & Z.Y.Su
- Corydalis rutifolia (Sm.) DC.
- Corydalis saccata Z.Y.Su
- Corydalis sajanensis Peschkova
- Corydalis saltatoria W.W.Sm.
- Corydalis × samuelssonii Fedde
- Corydalis sangardanica Mikhailova
- Corydalis sarcolepis Lidén & Z.Y.Su
- Corydalis saxicola Bunting
- Corydalis scaberula Maxim.
- Corydalis schanginii (Pall.) B.Fedtsch.
- Corydalis schelesnowiana Regel & Schmalh.
- Corydalis schistostigma X.F.Gao, Lidén, Y.W.Wang & Y.L.Peng
- Corydalis schusteriana Fedde
- Corydalis schweriniana Fedde
- Corydalis scouleri Hook.
- Corydalis semenowii Regel & Herder
- Corydalis sewerzowii Regel
- Corydalis shakyae Lidén
- Corydalis sheareri S.Moore
- Corydalis shennongensis H.Chuang
- Corydalis shensiana Lidén ex C.Y.Wu, H.Chuang & Z.Y.Su
- Corydalis sherriffii Ludlow
- Corydalis shimienensis C.Y.Wu & Z.Y.Su
- Corydalis sibirica (L.f.) Pers.
- Corydalis sigmantha Z.Y.Su & C.Y.Wu
- Corydalis sigmoides C.Y.Wu & H.Chuang
- Corydalis sikkimensis (Prain) Fedde
- Corydalis simplex Lidén
- Corydalis smithiana Fedde
- Corydalis sochivkoi Michajlova
- Corydalis solida (L.) Clairv.
- Corydalis sophronitis Z.Y.Su & Lidén
- Corydalis spathulata Prain ex Craib
- Corydalis speciosa Maxim.
- Corydalis spicata Lidén
- Corydalis staintonii Ludlow & Stearn
- Corydalis stenantha Franch.
- Corydalis stenophylla B.Saikia, Chowlu, M.K.Pathak & Lidén
- Corydalis stipulata Lidén
- Corydalis stolonifera Lidén
- Corydalis stracheyi Duthie ex Prain
- Corydalis straminea Maxim. ex Hemsl.
- Corydalis straminoides C.Y.Wu & Z.Y.Su
- Corydalis striatocarpa H.Chuang
- Corydalis stricta Stephan ex DC.
- Corydalis subjenisseensis E.M.Antipova
- Corydalis subverticillata Lazkov
- Corydalis susannae Lidén
- Corydalis suzhiyunii Lidén
- Corydalis taliensis Franch.
- Corydalis talpina Stepanov
- Corydalis tamarae Stepanov
- Corydalis tangutica Peschkova
- Corydalis tarkiensis Prokh.
- Corydalis tauricola (Cullen & P.H.Davis) Lidén
- Corydalis teberdensis A.P.Khokhr.
- Corydalis temolana C.Y.Wu & H.Chuang
- Corydalis temulifolia Franch.
- Corydalis tenerrima C.Y.Wu
- Corydalis tenuipes Lidén & Z.Y.Su
- Corydalis ternata (Nakai) Nakai
- Corydalis ternatifolia C.Y.Wu, Z.Y.Su & Lidén
- Corydalis terracina Lidén
- Corydalis thasia (Stoj. & Kitan.) Stoj. & Kitan.
- Corydalis thyrsiflora Prain
- Corydalis tianshanica Lidén
- Corydalis tianzhuensis M.S.Yan & C.J.Wang
- Corydalis tibetica Hook.f. & Thomson
- Corydalis tibeto-oppositifolia C.Y.Wu & T.Y.Shu
- Corydalis tibetoalpina C.Y.Wu & T.Y.Shu
- Corydalis tomentella Franch.
- Corydalis tongolensis Franch.
- Corydalis trachycarpa Maxim.
- Corydalis transalaica Popov
- Corydalis trifoliolata Franch.
- Corydalis trilobipetala Hand.-Mazz.
- Corydalis trisecta Franch.
- Corydalis triternata Zucc.
- Corydalis triternatifolia C.Y.Wu
- Corydalis tsangensis Lidén & Z.Y.Su
- Corydalis tsayulensis C.Y.Wu & H.Chuang
- Corydalis turtschaninovii Besser
- Corydalis udokanica Peschkova
- Corydalis uncinata Lidén
- Corydalis uncinatella Lidén
- Corydalis uniflora (Sieber) Nyman
- Corydalis uranoscopa Lidén
- Corydalis ussuriensis Aparina
- Corydalis uvaria Lidén & Z.Y.Su
- Corydalis vaginans Royle
- Corydalis verna Z.Y.Su & Lidén
- Corydalis verticillaris DC.
- Corydalis violacea (Vicary ex Prain) Pusalkar & D.K.Singh
- Corydalis virginea Lidén & Z.Y.Su
- Corydalis vittae Kolak.
- Corydalis vivipara Fedde
- Corydalis × vorobievii Urusov
- Corydalis vyschinii Bezd.
- Corydalis watanabei Kitag.
- Corydalis weigoldii Fedde
- Corydalis wendelboi Lidén
- Corydalis wilfordi Regel
- Corydalis wilsonii N.E.Br.
- Corydalis wuzhengyiana Z.Y.Su & Lidén
- Corydalis yanhusuo (Y.H.Chou & Chun C.Hsu) W.T.Wang ex Z.Y.Su & C.Y.Wu
- Corydalis yaoi Lidén & Z.Y.Su
- Corydalis yargongensis C.Y.Wu
- Corydalis yazgulemica Mikhailova & Sochivko
- Corydalis yui Lidén
- Corydalis yunnanensis Franch.
- Corydalis zadoiensis L.H.Zhou
- Corydalis zeravschanica Michajlova
- Corydalis zetterlundii Lidén
- Corydalis zhongdianensis Z.Y.Su & Lidén
