= Ulmus glabra 'Nitida' =

Elm cultivar

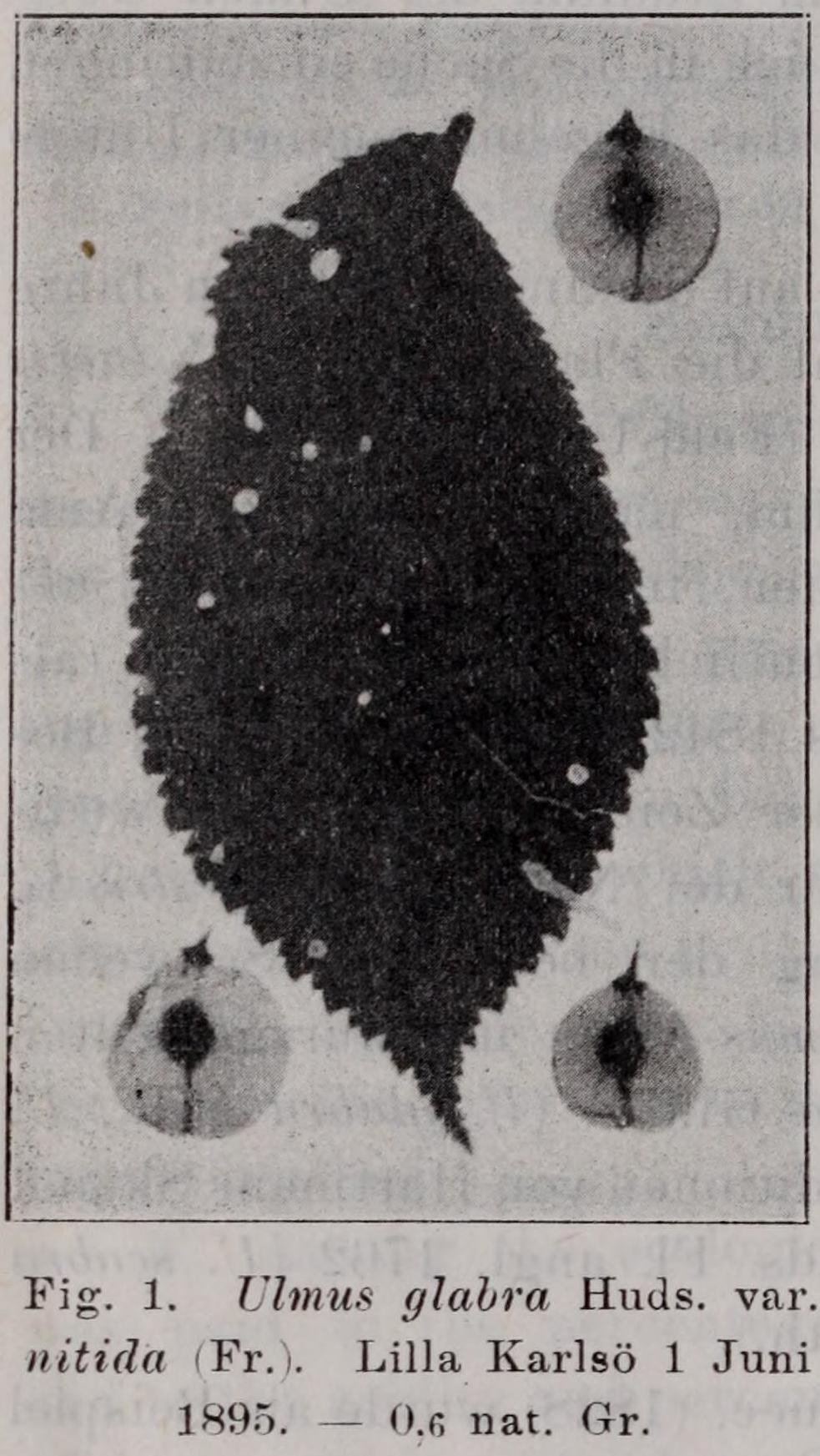
- 'Nitida' leaf and samarae, from tree on Lilla Karlsö, Gotland, Sweden
- Species: Ulmus glabra
- Cultivar: 'Nitida'
- Origin: Sweden

The wych elm cultivar Ulmus glabra 'Nitida' [:'shining', an allusion to the smooth upper surface of the leaves], the smooth glossy-leaved wych, was described by Fries from specimens collected by P. C. Afzelius in 1841 on the island of Stora Karlsö, Sweden, as Ulmus montana nitida, in Novitiae Florae Suecicae: continuatio, sistens Mantissam III: 20 (1842). The Novitiae Florae Gotlandicae (1844) confirmed U. montana f. nitida Fr. as present on the islands of Stora Karlsö and neighbouring Lilla Karlsö off Gotland, Sweden, but did not report it from Gotland proper. A Stora Karlsö specimen from the Herbarium E. Fries is preserved in the Botanical Museum of Uppsala. The tree was listed by Rehder as U. glabra Huds. f. nitida (1915), a designation adopted by Krüssmann (1984), the latter copying Rehder's 'Norway' provenance error.

A smooth-leaved wych occasionally appeared in collections outside Scandinavia. Syme in English Botany; or, Coloured Figures of British Plants. Volume VIII (1868) included an U. montana var. nitida.

U. minor is present on Gotland, leaving open the possibility that Fries's Ulmus montana nitida was not pure wych.

== Description ==
Krüssmann described f. nitida as having "leaves smooth above" and glabrous young shoots. An 1895 herbarium specimen from Lilla Karlsö shows a typical wych leaf with a short petiole, and a samara with seed on stalk side of centre, a feature of unhybridised wych.

Sowerby described var. nitida as having "all the essential characteristics of U. montana" [wych elm] but with leaves "shining and glabrous above". Ley (1910) noted that in the Kew specimen the samara was "rounder at the point than in the type", with the "notch distinct, its basal angle acute, reaching more than one-fifth [of the] way to [the] seed cavity".

== Pests and diseases ==
See under wych elm.

== Cultivation ==
The tree was planted in the streets of Skanör, Sweden, in the 19th century. 'Nitida' was described by Rehder (1915) as a form present in Norway (probably an error for Sweden) "and perhaps also in England". It was cultivated at Kew in the early 20th century as Ulmus scabra (glabra), the smooth-leaved wych, where it was described by Ley (1910), who had not seen it growing naturally in England. He later, however, prepared a herbarium specimen of a similar wych elm from Edmondsham, Dorset. Elwes and Henry do not mention the Kew specimen in their 1913 work.

== Synonymy ==
- Ulmus montana laevigata Fries, Summa. Veg. Scand. 53: 1846
- U. montana corylifolia f. laevis, Zapalowicz, Consp. Flor. Gallic.
