= Karlsö Islands =

The Karlsö Islands are two small Swedish islands in the Baltic Sea close to Gotland: Lilla Karlsö and Stora Karlsö.
