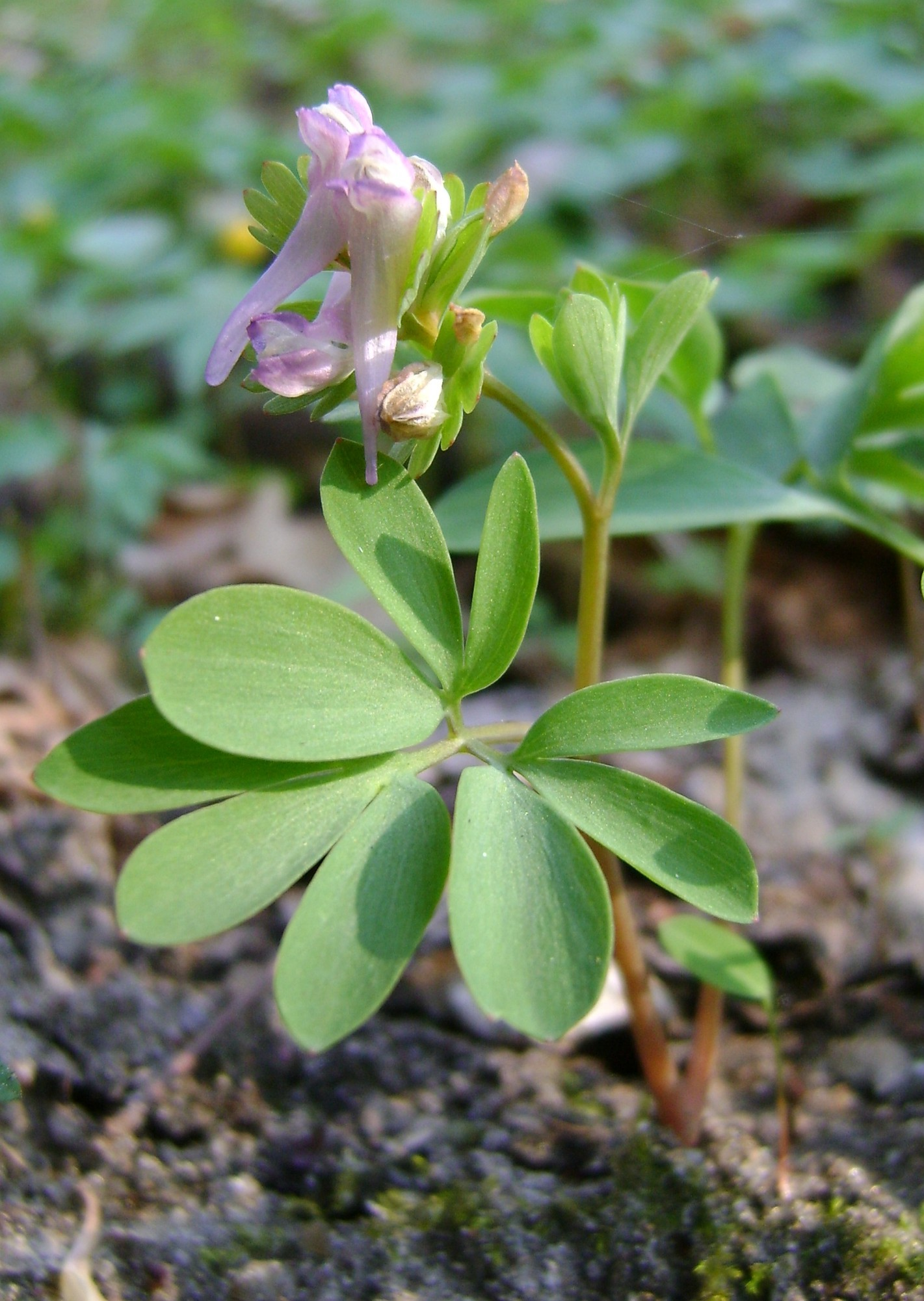

Scientific classification
- Kingdom: Plantae
- Clade: Tracheophytes
- Clade: Angiosperms
- Clade: Eudicots
- Order: Ranunculales
- Family: Papaveraceae
- Genus: Corydalis
- Species: C. pumila

Binomial name
- Corydalis pumila W.D.J.Koch, 1843
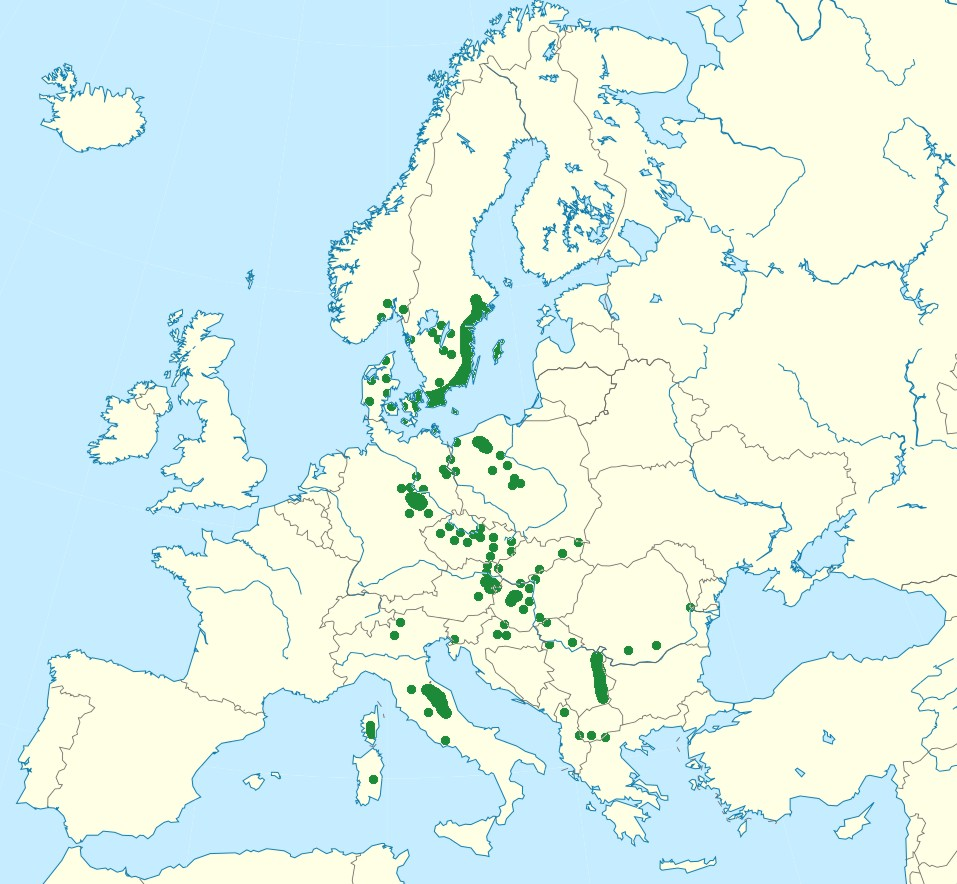

Synonyms
- Corydalis pumila Rchb.

= Corydalis pumila =

Species of flowering plants

Corydalis pumila is a species of plant in the family Papaveraceae. It is found in Central Europe and has a small, fragmented distribution. In Poland, it is a rare species found only in the western part of the country. It grows mainly in fertile deciduous forests, rarely in cemeteries and parks. The aboveground shoot develops only for two months in early spring. As a very rare species losing its habitats, it is subject to legal protection in Poland.

== Geographic distribution ==
The species has a relatively small and fragmented distribution range, covering Central Europe from southern Scandinavia to Sardinia, the central part of the Italian Peninsula and northern Greece. It is more common in such areas as southern Sweden, the region of the Harz mountains in Germany, and western Hungary. In the rest of the areas, the species' habitats are usually sparse and scattered.

In Poland, it can be found in the western part of the country and is generally a very rare plant. The largest number of habitats was found in the basin of the upper and middle Parsęta river and its tributaries, Wogra and Dębnica, in Western Pomerania (about 20), as well as in Greater Poland in the region of Śrem, Borek Wielkopolski and in the Lutynia river basin. The most numerous population of the species is found in the vicinity of Kamieniec on the Lower Oder river (the area of Professor Janina Jasnowska's Kamienieckie Wąwozy nature reserve). Other scattered habitats of the species are: the valley of the Krępiela river in Western Pomerania, the vicinity of Owczary in Lubusz Voivodeship, Borek and Jeżewo in Kuyavian–Pomeranian Voivodeship, Kowanówko and Sulmierzyce in Greater Poland, Głogów and Wrocław in Lower Silesia. In numerous habitat areas reported in the past, the species has not been found in recent years, such as in Świnoujście and Połchow in Western Pomerania, in the area of Słubice, Krosno Odrzańskie and Sława in Lubusz Voivodeship.

== Morphology ==
=== Habit ===
The plant spends most of the year as a tuber below the soil surface and only for about two months of spring develops a single leaf or shoot growing 5–15 (less often 20) cm above the soil surface. The shoot is bare, thin, below the ground surface with shortened nodes and scaly 5–7 cataphylls, and above the surface with a single, largest cataphyll. At its axil is a bud from which a shoot branch sometimes develops. Rarely, flowers develop on this branch, for example, when the main shoot is damaged.

=== Tuber ===
Full, spherical. It is usually found at a depth of 1 to 5, less often 8 cm, but on eroding slopes the tuber may appear on the surface. From the underside of the tuber grow fibrous roots with branching of only the first degree.

=== Leaves ===
Two (rarely three) on the main shoot, on long petioles, with the blade in outline broadly triangular, doubly or triply ternate. Leaves broadly ovate, oblong, blunt. All leaves are naked.

=== Flowers ===
Gathered in a 1–9-flowered (usually 2–6), pendulous inflorescence at the apex. Individual lilac-purple flowers grow on short peduncles (up to 2 mm long) in the axils of deeply palmately lobed bracts, having 4 to 7 patches. The flowers are distinctly spurred and 12–16 mm long. The two sepals of the calyx droop rapidly. The four petals of the corona are arranged in two whorls. The petals of the outer whorl form an upper and lower lip, with the former drawn back into a long spur. The petals of the inner whorl form two lateral wings. The stamens form two groups (upper and lower), each of which consists of a single stamen with two anthers, and attached by threads to it are two lateral, shorter stamens with single anthers. At the base of the upper group of stamens are nectaries that secrete nectar, accumulating in a spur. The ovary is upper, oblong, unicellular, but develops from two carpels. It contains 5 to 15 (usually 8 to 12) campylotrophic ovules arranged marginally. The ovary is topped by a long neck with a fork at the top.

=== Fruit ===
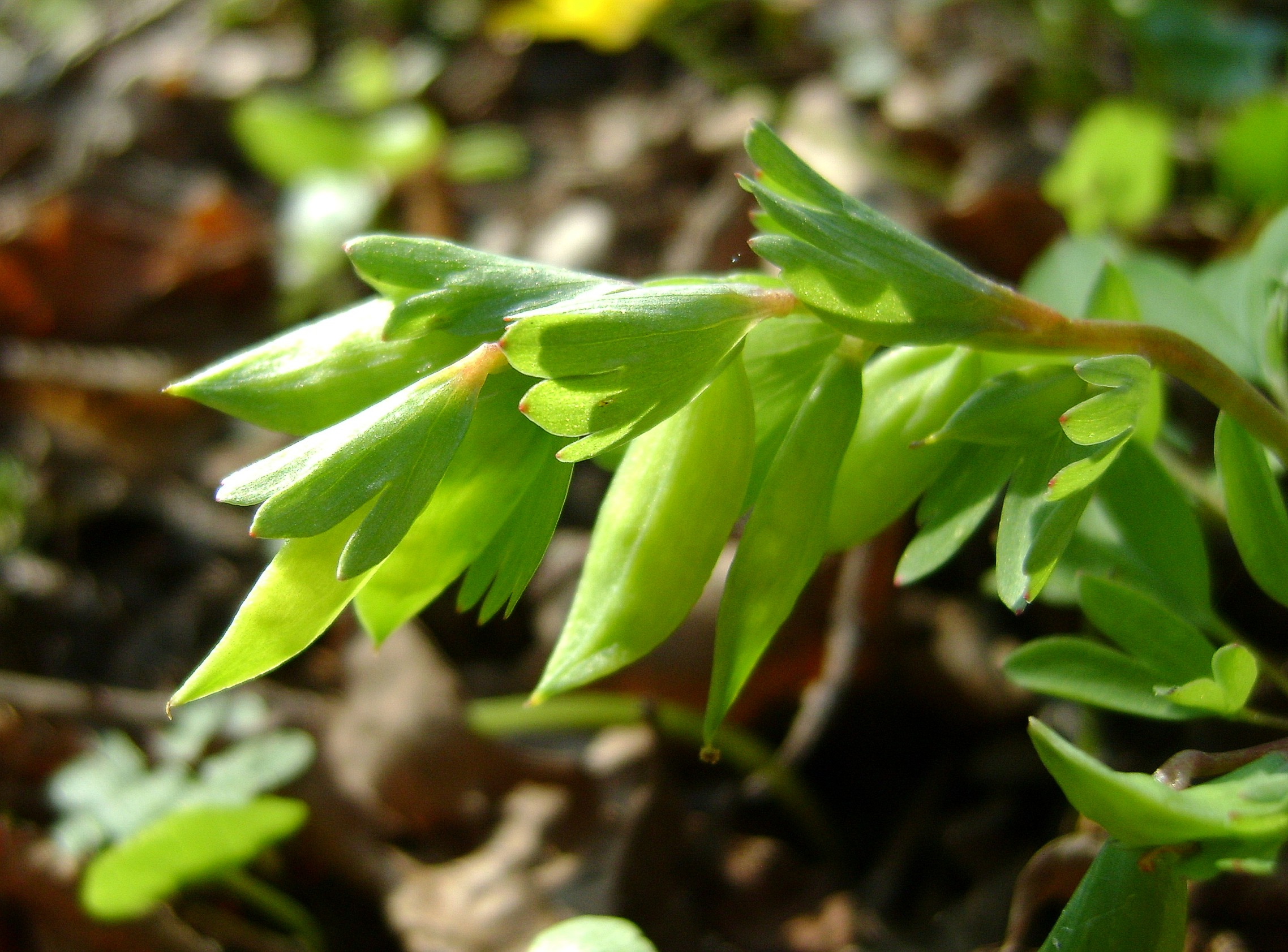
Fruit

The capsules are ovate-lanceolate, evenly tapered at both ends, reaching about 22 mm in length, set on stalks many times shorter than them (1–2 mm long). They open with two lobes, which remain green, rarely slightly reddish. Seeds number 5–12 per alternate attachment to both lobes of the capsule. They are spherical in shape and 1.5–2 mm in diameter. The seed coat is black and smooth, with a curved white elaiosome on its surface. During fruiting, the top part of the shoot droops or lies down. A single plant usually produces between 10 and 60 seeds.

=== Similar species ===
In Central Europe, Corydalis solida has a similar habit; its flowers are supported by divided bracts, although these are attached to stalks exceeding 4 mm in length (which elongate further during fruiting), while the flower and fruit stalks in Corydalis pumila always reach up to 2 mm. Corydalis intermedia and Corydalis cava have entire bracts.

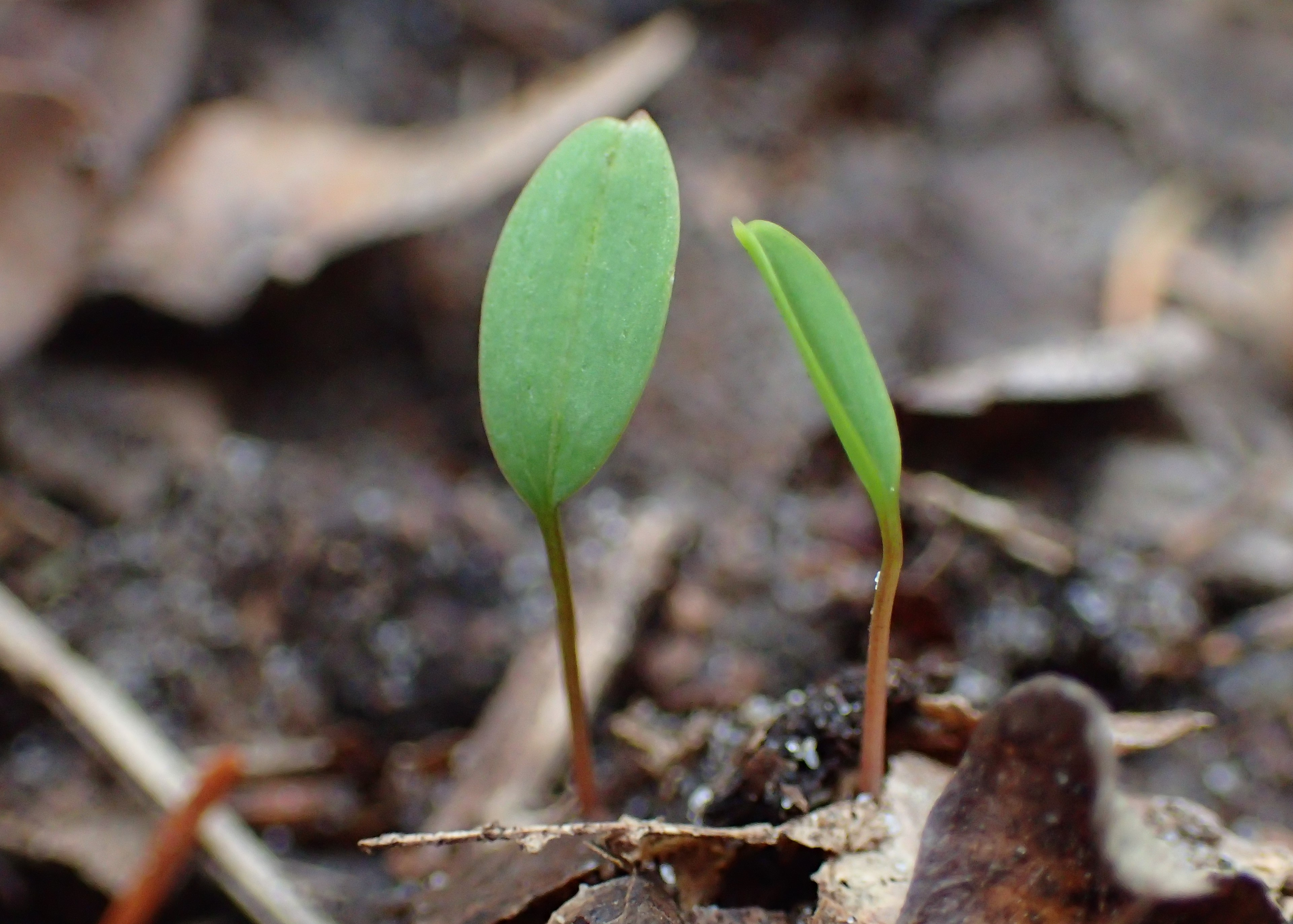
Seedlings

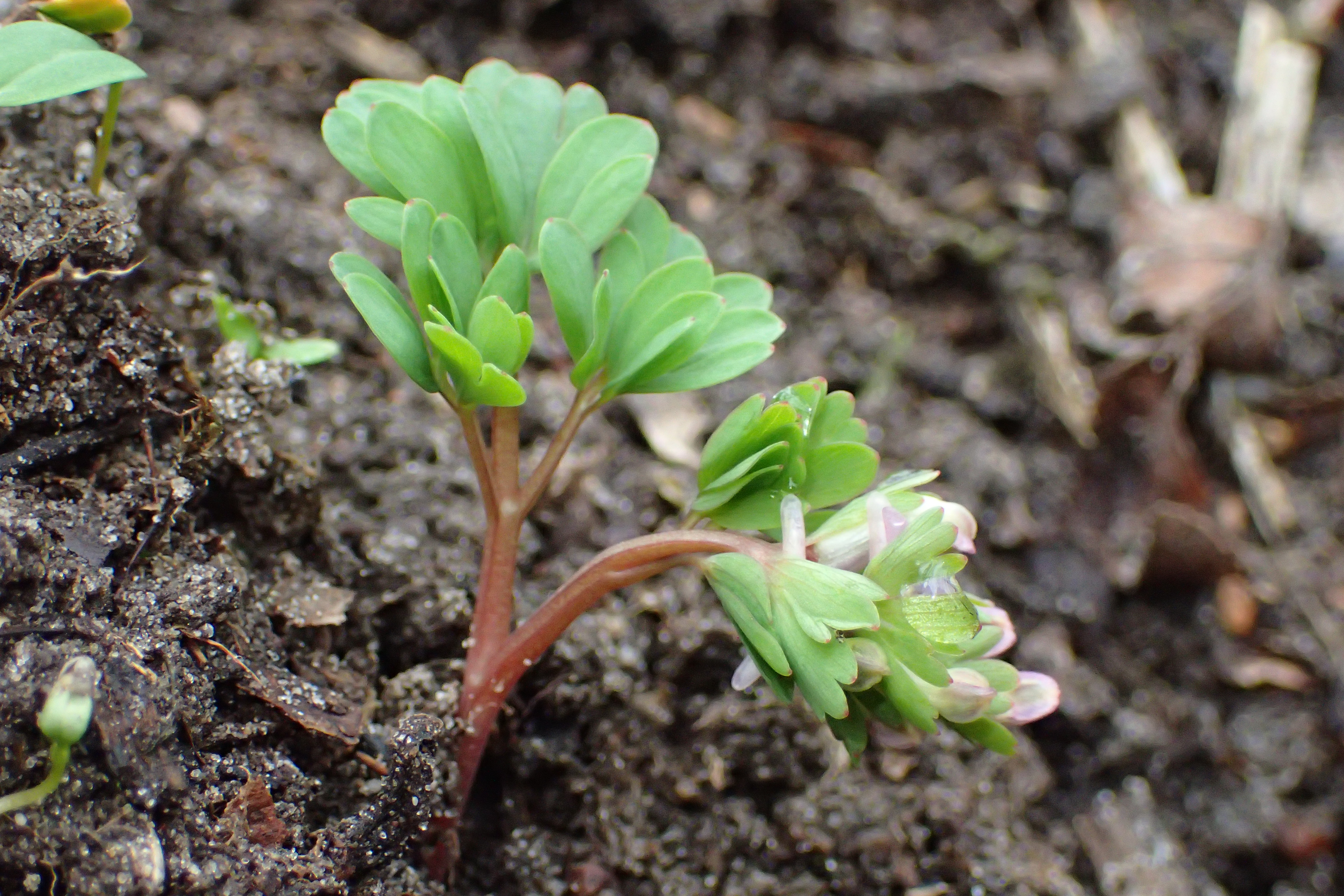
Habit

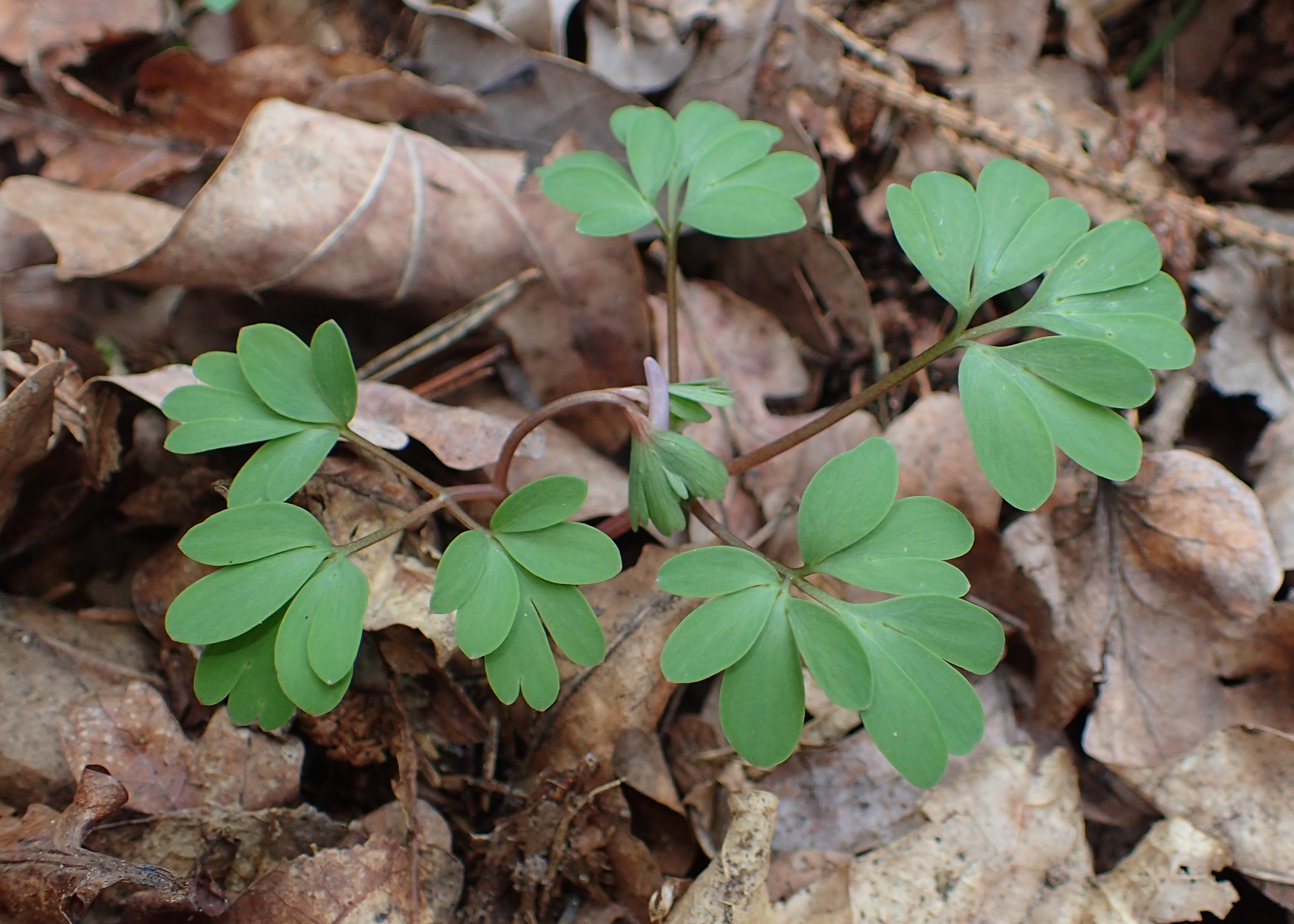
Habit

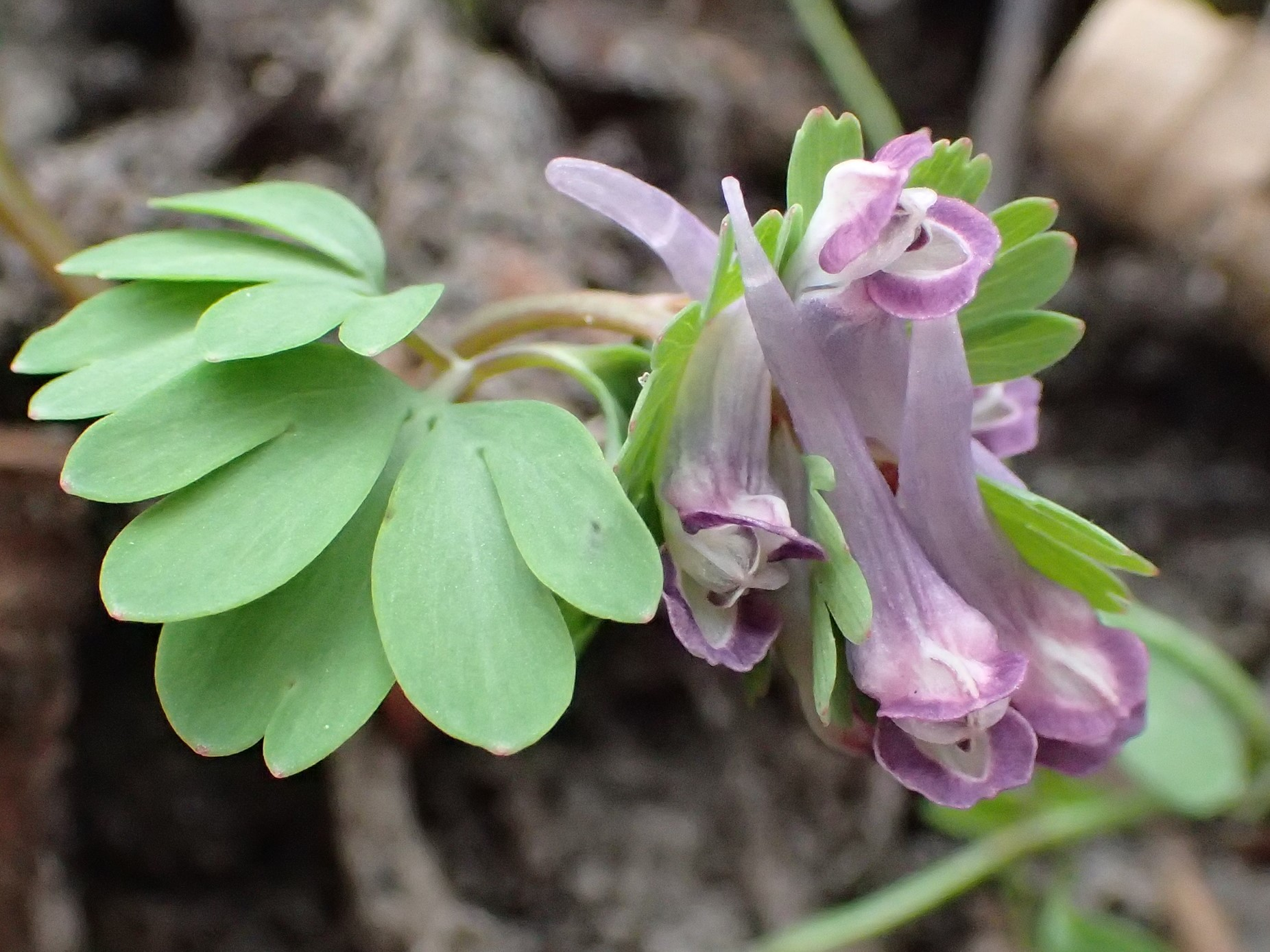
Flowers

== Development ==
Perennial, geophyte. Thanks to the reserve substances (starch) stored in the tuber, the plant quickly develops an aboveground shoot and blooms very early in the spring. The initially hooked shoot emerges above the soil surface within a few days, after temperatures rise above 10 °C. First, a leaf develops, then the inflorescence. The vegetation period of this species lasts only two months – in Central Europe the plant blooms in the second half of March to April, but in Sweden, in the northern range, Corydalis pumila starts blooming only in mid-May. Flowering lasts 2–4 weeks. The fruits ripen by mid-May, after which the aboveground shoots completely decay within 2–3 weeks after their release from the capsules. In Central Europe, by June there is usually no trace of the plants on the soil surface. At the time of flowering, a meristem is activated in the lower part of the tuber, forming a daughter tuber developing inside the old one, with which it is not anatomically connected. During the summer months, the ovules of next year's leaf and inflorescence shoot are formed in the tuber. These buds slowly elongate during autumn and winter. The old tuber, meanwhile, withers quickly, remaining for a short time in the form of coverings enveloping the daughter tuber. At the time of flowering, the roots growing from the old tuber also die off, and in September–October a new root system develops from the new tuber. Very rarely, two daughter tubers develop in place of one tuber. Except for such occasional cases of vegetative reproduction, plants of this species reproduce via seeds.

Flowers are pollinated by insects, but rarely self-pollination can also occur. Pollinators initially visit flowers for pollen, and over time also for the nectar collected in the flower spurs. Due to the elongated shape of the flower crown, insects with a proboscis at least 7–8 mm long can get to the nectar and accomplish pollination. Usually these are the hymenoptera: Anthophora acervorum, various species of the genus Bombus, the Western honeybee, and of butterflies, especially the common brimstone.

The seeds are equipped with elaiosomes rich in oils, making them eagerly carried by ants. The seeds of Corydalis pumila are more readily collected by these insects than those of other species of this genus. Seeds picked up by ants are transported for an average of 3–9 minutes over distances of up to 4 meters. At longer distances they are sometimes carried by water (floating on its surface), similarly to tubers, which can end up in watercourses as a result of landslides. The movement of spherical tubers is also facilitated by the dying of their roots in summer.

Seeds germinate the following year after dispersal and are unable to survive longer in nature. They retain their ability to germinate only if they have enough moisture in the summer (in dried seeds the embryo dies), and if they are cooled during the winter. About 10–50% of the seeds germinate, provided that the layer of leaves on the soil surface is thin or missing altogether. The seedlings of Corydalis pumila, as in many other representatives of this genus, are distinguished among dicotyledonous plants by forming only a single cotyledon. It is not known whether this is the result of the reduction and disappearance of the second, or the fusion of both cotyledons. During germination, a short primary root and hypocotyl develop – the cotyledon is raised above the soil surface on a long petiole. From the hypocotyl and upper part of the primary root, a tuber develops in the first growing season, with only a short end (up to 1 cm in length) of the primary root growing from the bottom part of the tuber. In the second growing season, the young plant sends out a single leaf with three leaflets above the soil surface. In subsequent years, the above-ground leaf becomes more prominent, and the underground tuber becomes larger. Plants begin to flower when they are 5–8 years old. Older plants usually bloom regularly every year, although they may develop only a vegetative shoot in case of unfavorable conditions in the previous year or due to strong competition from other plants. Because of the annual renewal of the tuber, plants of this species are theoretically immortal. In practice, they are estimated to reach a life span of about 15 years or more, but eventually perish due to competition, very poor weather conditions (e.g., severe drought), soil erosion or due to damage to the tuber.

== Genetics ==
It is a diploid species with a chromosome number of 2n = 16.

== Habitat and interspecies interactions ==
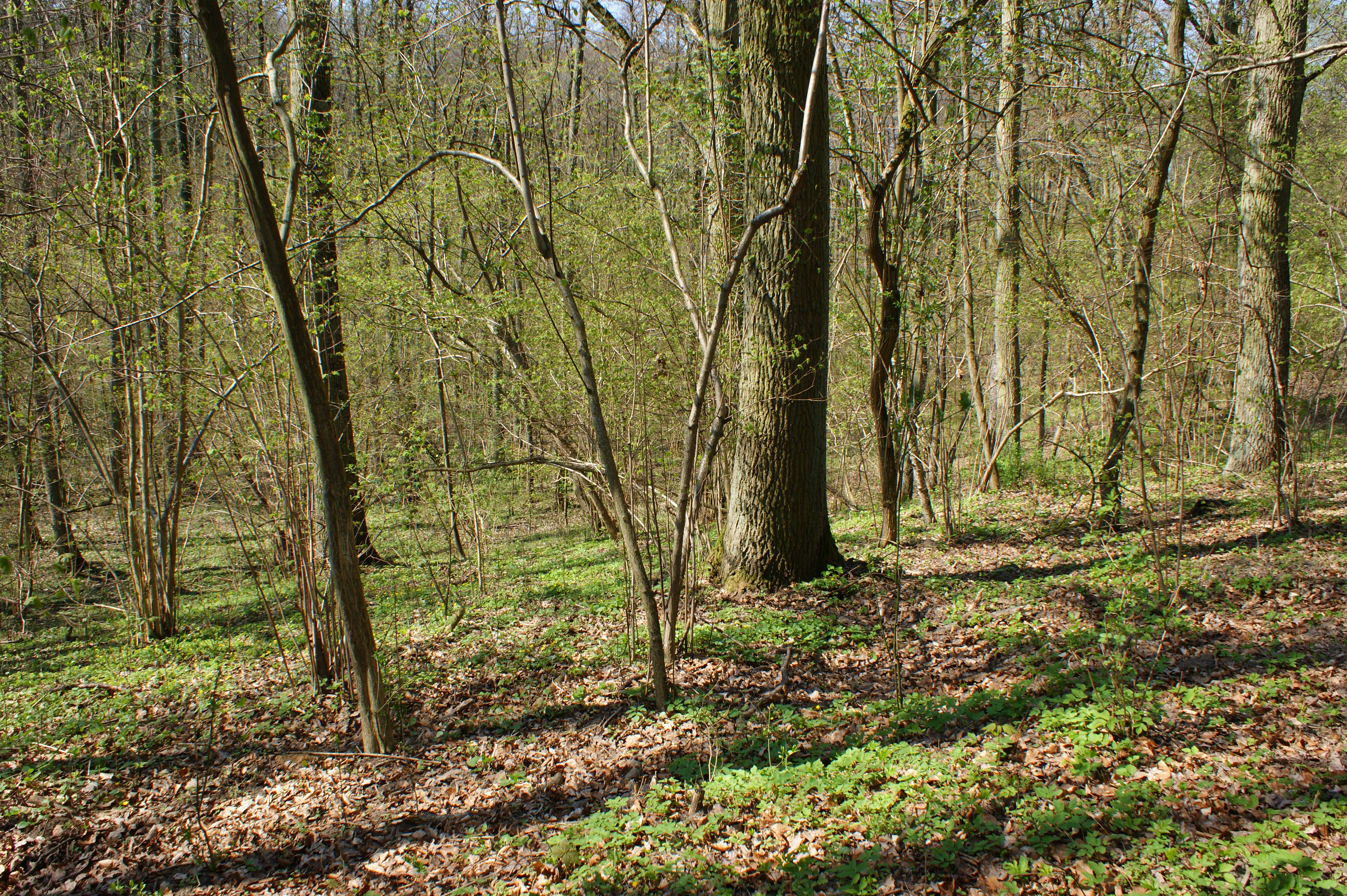
Oak-hornbeam forest in Professor Janina Jasnowska's Kamienieckie Wąwozy nature reserve – the location of the richest population of Corydalis pumila in Poland.

Corydalis pumila grows in a variety of forest and shrub communities on fairly rich, humus-filled soils, except where a thick layer of poorly decomposed leaves is present. It is often found on the slopes of river and stream valleys and on their bottoms, on uplifted, occasionally flooded sediments. In addition, it is also common on forest edges, from where fallen leaves are blown away by the wind. The soil in places where it grows is usually quite moist in early spring, but often severely dry in late spring and summer. The plant tolerates frosts well, but if a long period of dry and hot weather occurs in spring, the above-ground shoots wither and as a result do not produce seeds, and some plants also die at that time.

The species inhabits forests and thickets of Carpinion betuli (less often riparian) as well as scrublands, and it is sometimes present in robin forests, parks and cemeteries in suburban secondary forests with maples, ash and elm trees. It also invades xerothermic grasslands adjacent to forests and thickets, wet meadows and even mowed lawns. The species conspicuously avoids beech forests (except on the Apennine Peninsula, where it grows in beech forests at elevations of 800 to 1,500 meters above sea level) and forests with coniferous species. In the classification of plant communities of Central Europe, the species is characteristic of O. Fagetalia. Throughout its range, however, it grows in a wide variety of forest communities.

Among the species most often accompanying in the undergrowth of Corydalis pumila are: pilewort (Ficaria verna), ivy-leaved speedwell (Veronica hederifolia), wood bluegrass (Poa nemoralis), and numerous geophytes from genera: yellow star-of-Bethlehem (Gagea), Adoxa, windflowers (Anemone), winter aconite (Eranthis), squills (Scilla) and other species of the genus Corydalis. Also frequent are nitrophilous forest and fringe species: St. Benedict's herb (Geum urbanum), cleavers (Galium aparine) and garlic mustard (Alliaria petiolata). In general, however, in Corydalis habitats there is little competition from other species, and under optimal conditions the dominant species is usually Corydalis pumila. Where such nitrophilous plants as common nettle (Urtica dioica), ground elder (Aegopodium podagraria) and cow parsley (Anthriscus sylvestris) grow strongly, Corydalis pumila does not occur.

=== Herbivores ===
Herbivores rarely prey on the Corydalis pumila. Among the exceptions is the Portuguese slug (Arion lusitanicus), which is invasive in Central Europe. When the pre-spring is warm, these slugs can appear en masse during the flowering time of the Corydalis pumila, causing serious damage to all parts of the plant, significantly reducing the effectiveness of their reproduction. Feeding by insects on Corydalis pumila is rare, except for bumblebees sometimes biting through the flower spur to access nectar. In the Czech Republic, where the habitats of clouded Apollo and Corydalis pumila overlap, it is the main host plant for the larvae of this butterfly.

=== Fungal pathogens ===
Probably due to the short-lived nature of aboveground shoots, they are rarely infected by fungal pathogens. There have been isolated cases recorded of Melampsora populnea and Peronospora corydalis developing on this species.

=== Mycorrhiza ===
Mycorrhiza most likely does not occur in this species, as in other members of the genus. This is supposed to be evidenced by the fact that the tubers always root successfully after transfer.

== Taxonomy, variation and hybrids ==
The species belongs to the section Corydalis Linden comprising 54 species out of about 465 isolated in the genus Corydalis. It is most closely related to the European Corydalis intermedia and fumewort (Corydalis solida), as well as the Siberian and East Asian Corydalis remota.

It very easily forms fertile hybrids with fumewort – Corydalis × laxa Fries. They are widespread in areas where the ranges of the parental species overlap, and in places where both co-occur – often the hybrids dominate, displacing the parental taxa. Such a situation occurs in central and eastern Sweden, locally in Germany and Slovakia. Very rarely, infertile hybrids of Corydalis pumila and Corydalis intermedia, as well as Corydalis pumila and Corydalis cava, are formed.

For a long time, the species was not separated from fumewort. As a separate species (then Fumaria pumila) it was described in 1831 by the Austrian botanist – Nicolaus Thomas Host. The following year Ludwig Reichenbach separated the genus Corydalis from the genus Fumaria and thus established the current scientific name.

Morphological variability within the species is rather low, and the recorded differences in the number of flowers and the dimensions of the shoot and leaves are explained by the influence of habitat conditions. In any case, intraspecific taxa are not distinguished.

== Threats and protection ==
One of the main threats to the species is the transformation of its natural habitat. In particular, deforestation and increased trophic levels, resulting in the expansion of stronger-growing species and displacing Corydalis pumila, contribute to the receding of the species.

The species is considered endangered where it is particularly rare: in Poland, Austria, Romania, German Brandenburg and Thuringia. It is not considered endangered in Saxony-Anhalt and Mecklenburg-Vorpommern, Sweden, Denmark, the Czech Republic and Hungary.

Categories of threat to the species in Poland:

- Threat category in Poland according to the Red List of Plants and Fungi in Poland (2006, 2016): V (VU) (vulnerable to extinction).
- Threat category in Poland according to the Polish Red List of Plants (2014): VU (vulnerable).

The plant in Poland has been under strict species protection since 2004, and as of February 15, 2023, the habitat of Corydalis pumila is protected in Professor Janina Jasnowska's Kamienieckie Wąwozy nature reserve.

== Bibliography ==
- Ruggiero, Michaela A. (2015). "A Higher Level Classification of All Living Organisms". PLOS ONE. 10 (4) e0119248. Bibcode:2015PLoSO..1019248R. doi:10.1371/journal.pone.0119248. PMC 4418965. PMID 25923521.
- Stevens, Peter F. (2001). "Angiosperm Phylogeny Website". Missouri Botanical Garden.
