= Ajvide Settlement =

Ancient settlement in Gotland, Sweden

- Ajvideboplatsen
- Ajvide Settlement location on Gotland
- 57°16′51.91″N 18°10′8.82″E
- Type: Pitted Ware culture settlement
- Location: Ajvide, Eksta, Gotland, Sweden
- Nearest city: Klintehamn

History
- Built: Late Mesolithic – mid Bronze Age

Site notes
- Area: 200,000 m^{2} (2,200,000 ft^{2})
- Governing body: Gotland County

The Ajvide Settlement (Swedish: Ajvideboplatsen) is located in Ajvide, Eksta, on the western coast of Gotland, Sweden. It covers an area of 200,000 m^{2} (2,200,000 ft^{2}) and was occupied from the Late Mesolithic through to the mid Bronze Age. The majority of the activity on the site took place during the Middle Neolithic period (3100 – 2700 BC). This phase of activity belongs to the Pitted Ware culture. Around 2900 BC, the site suffered from a marine transgression.

== Archaeological excavations ==
Since 1983, Stockholm University and later the Gotland University, have conducted archaeological investigations at the settlement. Inger Österholm and Göran Burenhult, both professors of archeology at Gotland University, have conducted much of the recent research on Neolithic Gotland, including the Ajvide Settlement.

The principal feature of the site is a burial ground containing some 80 graves. More than one body is buried in some of the graves, whilst some others may be cenotaphs. Most of these graves date to later than the main phase of Pitted Ware activity. Adjacent to the cemetery, to the east, is an area of very dark soil that contains a mixture of artifacts, pottery and bone fragments. In some texts on this site, this area is referred to as the black area, and is believed to have a possible ceremonial function. However, Österholm has suggested that it may in fact represent the processing of seal train oil.

== Find ==
A significant faunal assemblage has been recovered from the site. This suggests that in the late Mesolithic, the local economy was based upon hunting of grey, ringed and harp seals, porpoise and fishing. Cattle, sheep, and pigs were introduced at the start of the Neolithic. However, there was a resurgence in seal hunting and fishing by the Middle Neolithic. Cattle and sheep returned during the late Neolithic and Bronze Age. It has been argued that the pigs which remain on Gotland during the Pitted Ware phase are in fact wild or feral animals, implying a general return to hunting and gathering during this period and not just a reversion to marine resources. Examination of the helical fracture pattern and dynamic impact scars of the bones from the Ajvide Settlement suggests that bone marrow extraction took place at this site.
