= Eksta =

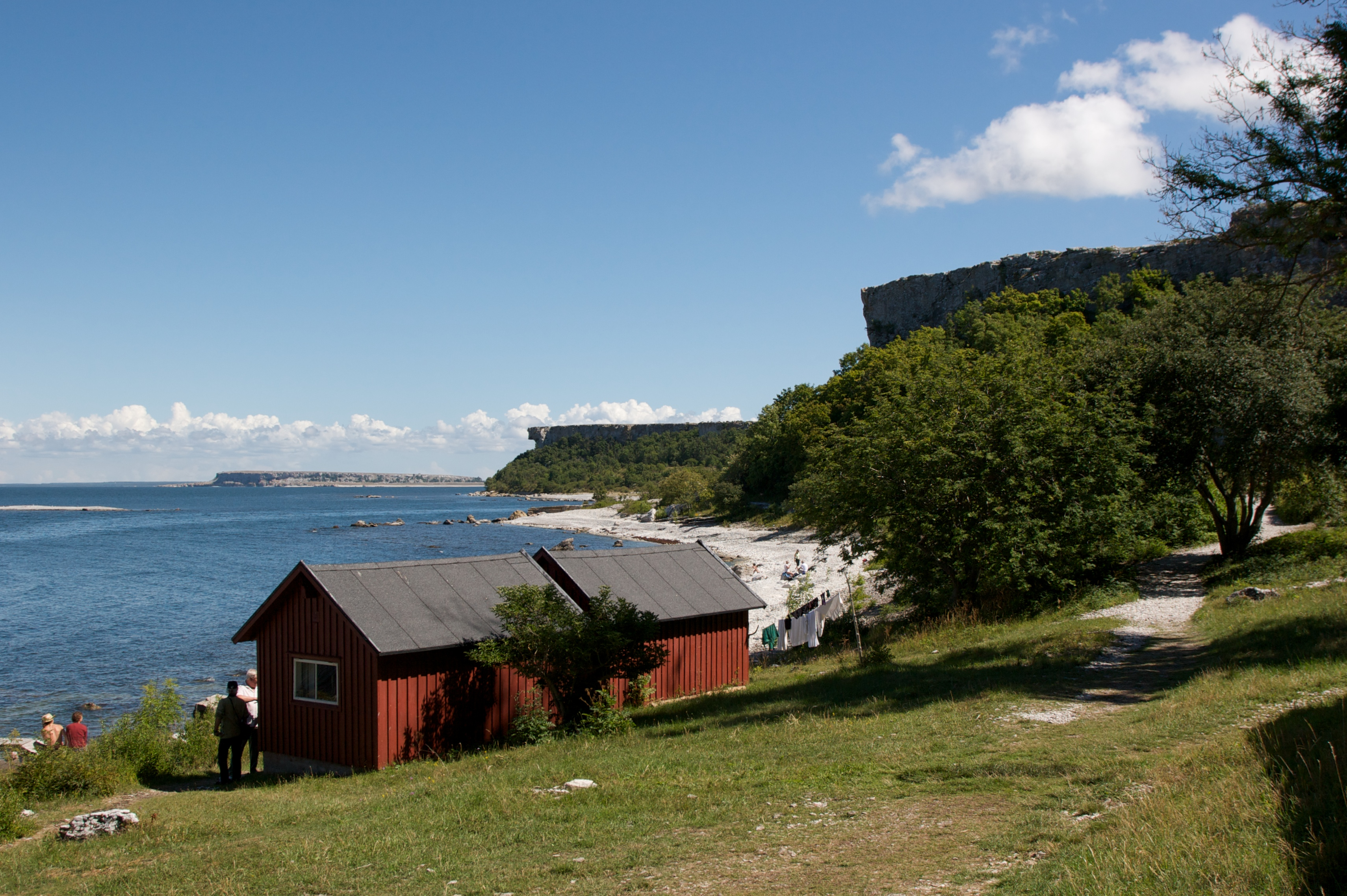
- Stora Karlsö and Lilla Karlsö in Eksta

- Location within Gotland
- Coordinates: 57°17′11″N 18°12′23″E
- Country: Sweden
- Province: Gotland
- County: Gotland County
- Municipality: Gotland Municipality

Area
  - Total: 46.21 km^{2} (17.84 sq mi)

Population (2014)
  - Total: 259
- Time zone: UTC+1 (CET)
  - Summer (DST): UTC+2 (CEST)

Eksta is a populated area, a socken (not to be confused with parish), on the Swedish island of Gotland. It comprises the same area as the administrative Eksta District, established on 1 January 2016.

== Geography ==
Eksta is situated on the southwest coast of Gotland. The medieval Eksta Church is located in the socken. The two islands Stora Karlsö and Lilla Karlsö just off the coast of Gotland are also part of Eksta.

As of 2019, Eksta Church belongs to Eksta parish in Klinte pastorat.

== History ==
The remains of a Pitted Ware culture settlement along with 85 graves from that Middle Neolithic period, have been found at Ajvide in Eksta. The settlement has been excavated and is known as the Ajvide Settlement, (Swedish: Ajvideboplatsen). Ajvide is also known for its beach meadow, Ajvide strandänge, one of only two on Gotland that are still used for harvesting hay.
