= Eksta Church =

- Eksta kyrka
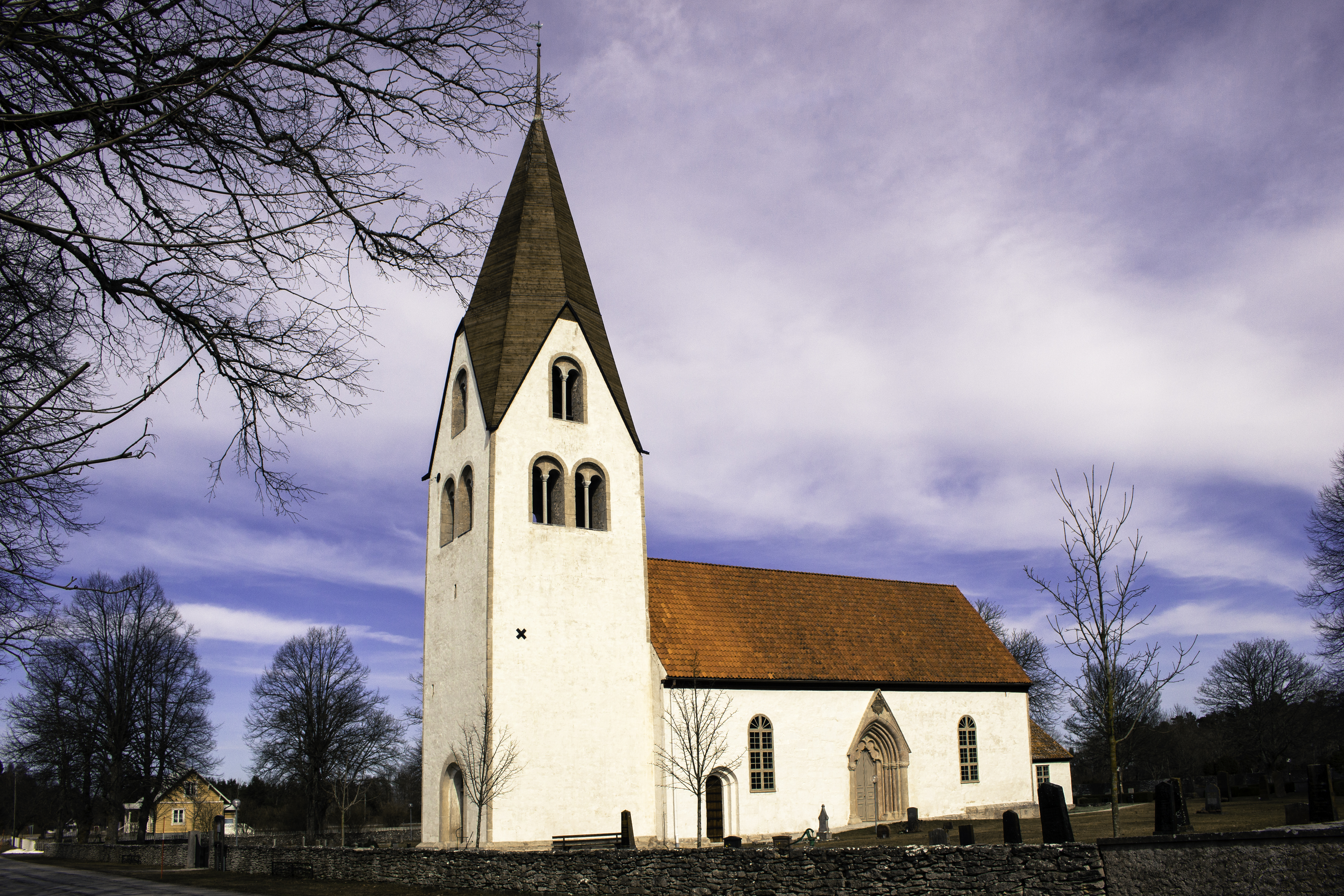
- Eksta Church, view of the exterior

- Location on Gotland
- 57°17′11″N 18°12′23″E
- Country: Sweden
- Denomination: Church of Sweden

Administration
- Diocese: Visby

Eksta Church (Swedish: Eksta kyrka) is a medieval church in Eksta on the Swedish island of Gotland, in the Diocese of Visby. The church underwent substantial changes during a restoration in 1838.

== History and architecture ==
The oldest part of Eksta Church is the tower, dating from the 13th century and still unchanged. The rest of the church is also from the Middle Ages, but was heavily rebuilt in 1838. The church still has four medieval portals, in both Romanesque and Gothic style. The interior of the church is largely Neoclassical, dating from the 1838 renovation. A few traces of medieval murals have survived on the walls, as has a single stained glass window pane – a rare example of in situ medieval stained glass in Sweden.

The church was renovated in 2010.
