= Edmondsham =

Village in Dorset, England

Coordinates: 50.902°N 1.913°W

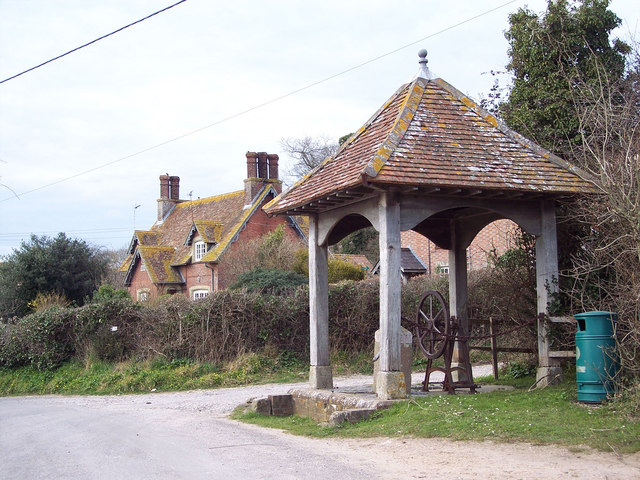
- Village pump, Edmondsham

- Location within Dorset
- Population: 200
- OS grid reference: SU062114
- Civil parish: Edmondsham
- Unitary authority: Dorset
- Ceremonial county: Dorset
- Region: South West
- Country: England
- Sovereign state: United Kingdom
- Post town: WIMBORNE
- Postcode district: BH21
- Dialling code: 01725
- Police: Dorset
- Fire: Dorset and Wiltshire
- Ambulance: South Western
- UK Parliament: North Dorset

Edmondsham is a village in Dorset, England. It is 2 miles (3 km) north west of Verwood and 10 miles (16 km) north of Bournemouth, near the source of a small stream which flows into the River Crane, Dorset; both are Sites of Special Scientific Interest. In the 2001 census it had a population of 200.

A rare shiny-leafed form of wych elm similar to 'Nitida' was found in the village in the early 20th century, a leaf specimen prepared for the Kew Herbarium by Augustin Ley in 1910.

== Edmondsham House ==
Edmondsham House was built in 1589 by builders William Arnold and family, and in 1905 was described by Sir Frederick Treves as "grey with age" and hence "like a mist in the wood". The house and gardens are open to the public.
