= Stora Karlsö Lighthouse =

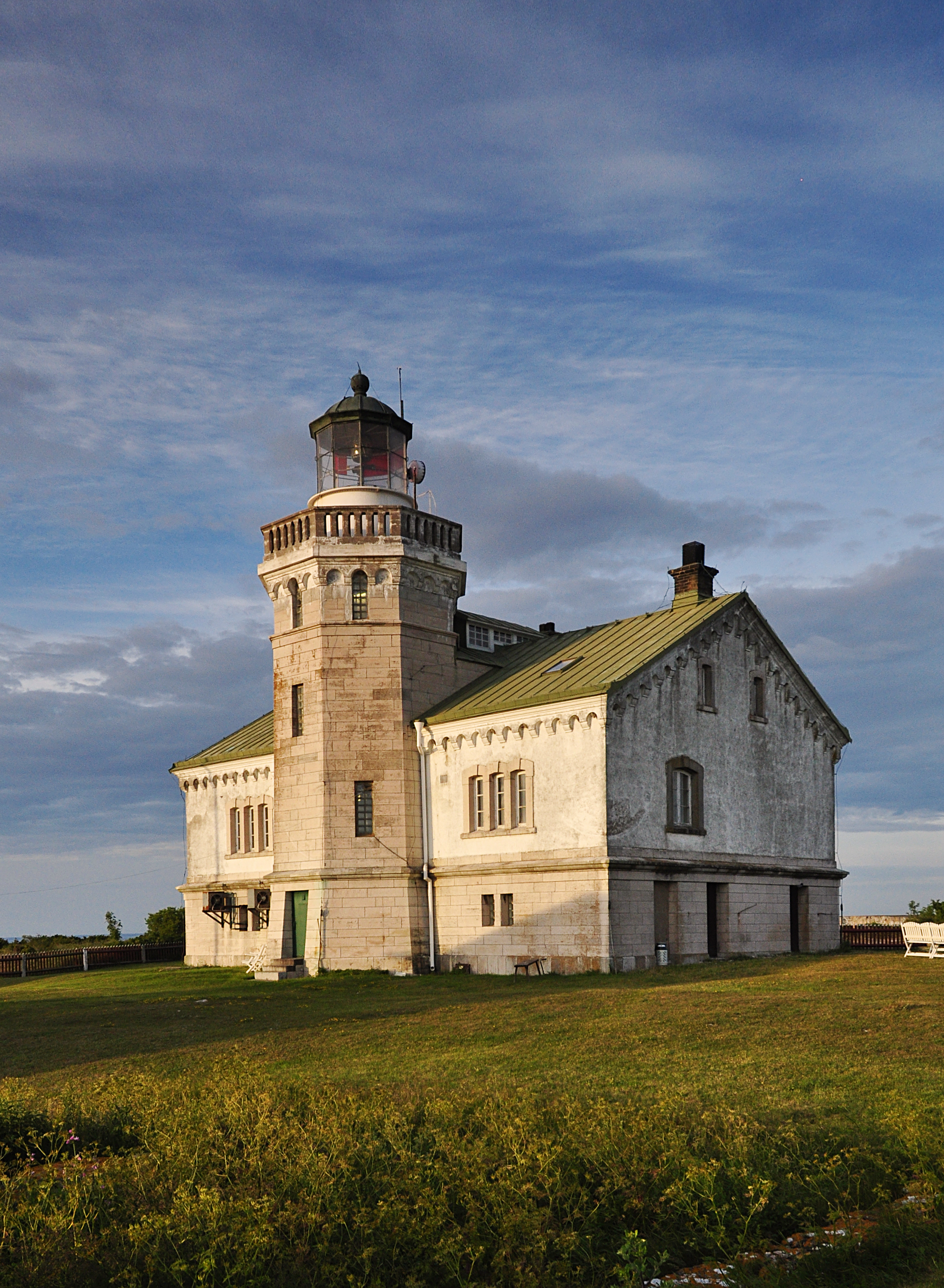
- Stora Karlsö Lighthouse
- Location: Stora Karlsö, Region Gotland, Sweden
- Coordinates: 57.289710°N 17.958780°E

Tower
- Constructed: 1887
- Construction: stone tower
- Automated: 1974
- Height: 18 metres (59 ft)
- Shape: octagonal tower with balcony and lantern attached to a 2-storey keeper’s house
- Markings: unpainted tower, greenish lantern dome
- Power source: kerosene, electricity
- Operator: Stora Karlsö
- Heritage: governmental listed building

Light
- Focal height: 56 metres (184 ft)
- Lens: 4th order Fresnel lens
- Intensity: 1,000 watt
- Range: white: 16 nautical miles (30 km; 18 mi) red: 13 nautical miles (24 km; 15 mi)
- Characteristic: LFl(2) WR 12s
- Sweden no.: SV-4250

Stora Karlsö Lighthouse (Swedish: Stora Karlsö fyr), is a Swedish lighthouse on Stora Karlsö island off Gotland in the Baltic Sea. It was built in 1887 and resulted in the first permanent settlement on the island in modern times. A house for the lighthouse keeper was built in the 1930s. In 1974, the lighthouse became fully automated when a cable for electricity was laid to the island and the last permanent residents left the island.

In 2010, the lighthouse was decommissioned and replaced by a solar cell powered lamp on a mast next to the lighthouse.
