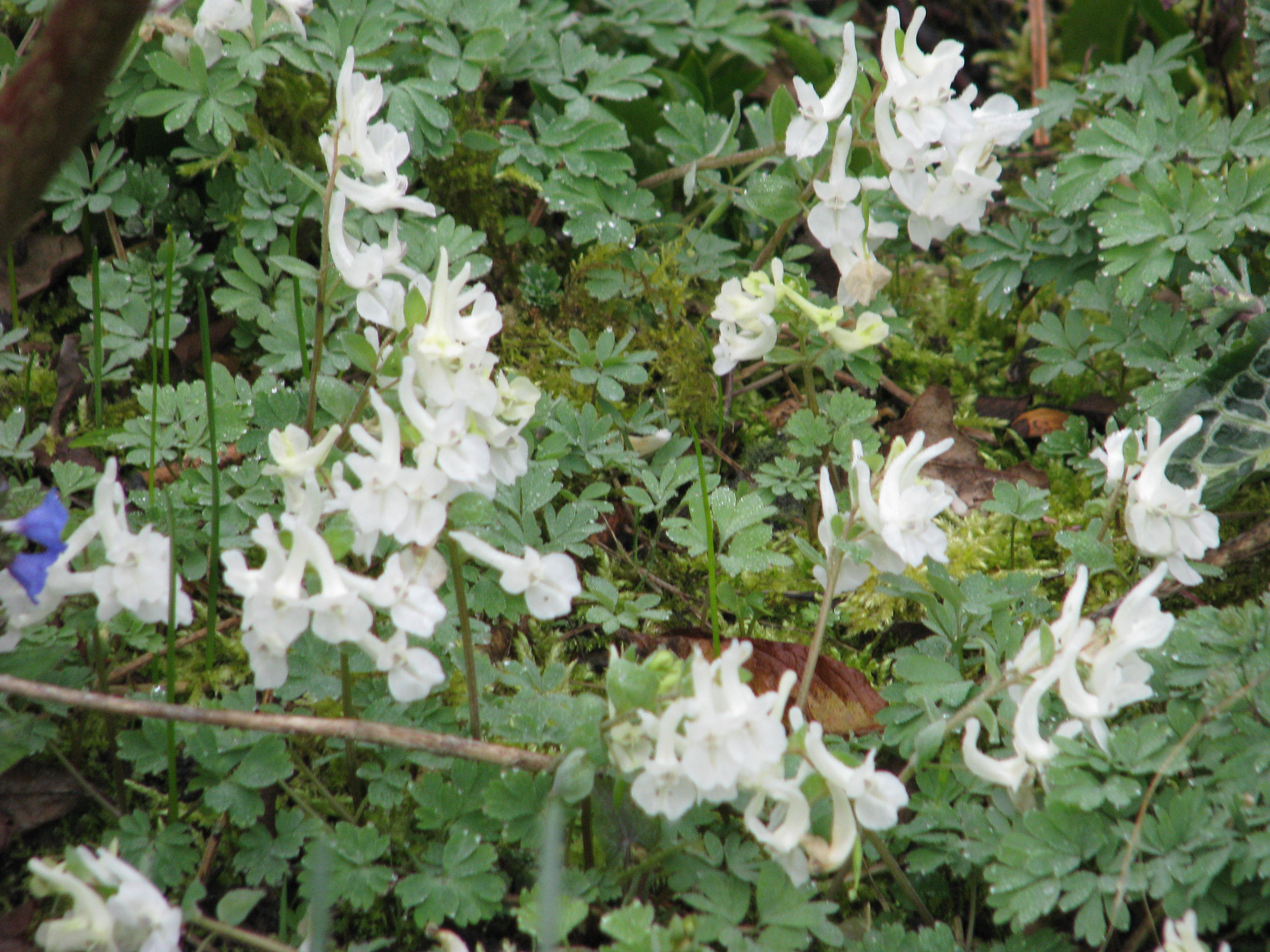

Scientific classification
- Kingdom: Plantae
- Clade: Tracheophytes
- Clade: Angiosperms
- Clade: Eudicots
- Order: Ranunculales
- Family: Papaveraceae
- Genus: Corydalis
- Species: C. caucasica

Binomial name
- Corydalis caucasica DC. (1821)

Subspecies
- Corydalis caucasica subsp. abantensis Lidén; Corydalis caucasica subsp. caucasica

Synonyms
- Capnites caucasicus (DC.) Rupr.(1869); Corydalis solida var. caucasica (DC.) Jordanov & Kožuharov (1970)

= Corydalis caucasica =

Species of flowering plant

Corydalis caucasica is a species of flowering plant in the poppy family Papaveraceae, native to the Caucasus and northern Turkey.

== Description ==
Growing to 15 cm (5.9 in) high and broad, it is a tuberous herbaceous perennial, with glaucous green leaves and clusters of tubular white flowers in spring. It is a spring ephemeral whose foliage dies down in the summer.

== Subspecies ==
Two subspecies are accepted.

- Corydalis caucasica subsp. abantensis Lidén – Bolu Province of northern Turkey
- Corydalis caucasica subsp. caucasica (synonyms Corydalis kusnetzovii Khokhr., C. malkensis Galushko, Fumaria bulbosa Gueldenst. ex Ledeb., F. fabacea M.Bieb., and F. intermedia Gueldenst. ex Ledeb.) – Caucasus and northern Turkey

== Cultivation ==
Suitable for cultivation in a rock garden or alpine house, it requires sharp drainage in a sunny or partially shaded location which is dry in summer and damp in the winter. It has gained the Royal Horticultural Society's Award of Garden Merit (as Corydalis malkensis).
