= Stora Karlsö =

Nature reserve in Gotland, Sweden

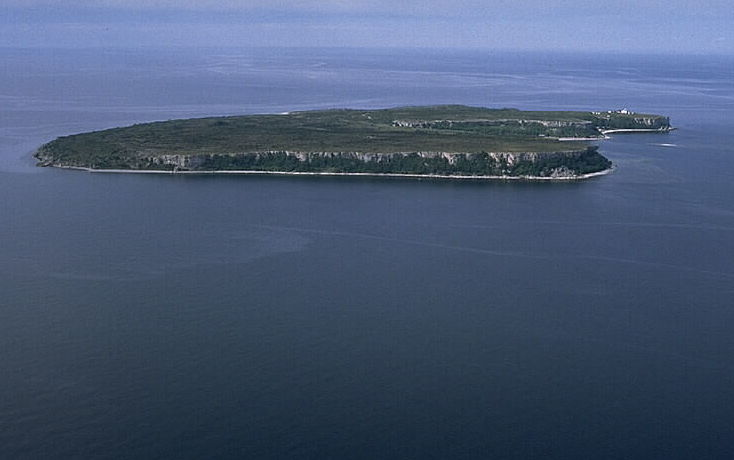
- Stora Karlsö from the air

- Location within Gotland

Geography
- Location: Baltic Sea
- Coordinates: 57°17′1″N 17°58′19″E
- Area: 2.5 km^{2} (0.97 sq mi)
- Length: 1.5 km (0.93 mi)
- Width: 2 km (1.2 mi)
- Highest elevation: 52 m (171 ft)

Administration
- Sweden

Additional information
- Official website: Welcome to Stora Karlsö

Stora Karlsö is a small Swedish island in the Baltic Sea, situated about 6 km (3.7 mi) west of the island of Gotland and part of Eksta socken.

== Environment ==
Stora Karlsö has an area of about 2.5 km^{2} (0.97 mi^{2}). It is mainly a limestone plateau, up to 52 m (171 ft) in height, bordered by steep cliffs along the shore. It is mostly covered with alvar. It is a nature reserve, the second oldest in the world after Yellowstone National Park.

=== Flora and fauna ===
The island is mostly known for its rich flora and birdlife. There are many juniper bushes and some small groves of deciduous trees. In spring, there is an extraordinary number of orchids, mostly elder-flowered orchid and early purple orchid. There are also several very rare plants for Sweden such as Adonis vernalis, Lactuca quercina (called Karlsösallat in Swedish), hart's-tongue fern and Corydalis gotlandica (the only endemic plant of Gotland).

Stora Karlsö also has large colonies of common guillemots (about 15,700 breeding pairs) and razorbills (12,000 pairs, in 2014–2015). Along with neighbouring Lilla Karlsö, it has been designated an Important Bird Area (IBA) by BirdLife International.

== History ==
There is evidence that Stora Karlsö has been inhabited since the Stone Age. During the Middle Ages there was a marble quarry, which gave the material for many of Gotland's churches. The island is a nature reserve, and after Yellowstone National Park is the oldest established protected nature area in the world. From May to August there are tour boats from the village Klintehamn.

The Stora Karlsö Lighthouse was built in 1887. A house for the lighthouse keeper was added in the 1930s, which resulted in the island getting its first permanent residents in modern times. Since 1974, the lighthouse is automated and there are no permanent residents on the island. The lighthouse and the surrounded buildings are now listed.

Climate data for Stora Karlsö 1991-2020
| Month | Jan | Feb | Mar | Apr | May | Jun | Jul | Aug | Sep | Oct | Nov | Dec | Year |
|---|---|---|---|---|---|---|---|---|---|---|---|---|---|
| Mean daily maximum °C (°F) | 3.4 (38.1) | 3.0 (37.4) | 4.7 (40.5) | 8.3 (46.9) | 13.1 (55.6) | 17.6 (63.7) | 20.6 (69.1) | 20.3 (68.5) | 16.5 (61.7) | 11.3 (52.3) | 7.4 (45.3) | 4.7 (40.5) | 10.9 (51.6) |
| Daily mean °C (°F) | 2.0 (35.6) | 1.6 (34.9) | 3.0 (37.4) | 6.1 (43.0) | 10.6 (51.1) | 15.0 (59.0) | 18.3 (64.9) | 18.3 (64.9) | 14.6 (58.3) | 9.8 (49.6) | 6.0 (42.8) | 3.3 (37.9) | 9.1 (48.4) |
| Mean daily minimum °C (°F) | 0.7 (33.3) | 0.2 (32.4) | 1.3 (34.3) | 4.0 (39.2) | 7.1 (44.8) | 12.5 (54.5) | 16.1 (61.0) | 16.2 (61.2) | 12.8 (55.0) | 7.7 (45.9) | 4.8 (40.6) | 1.8 (35.2) | 7.1 (44.8) |

== Gallery ==
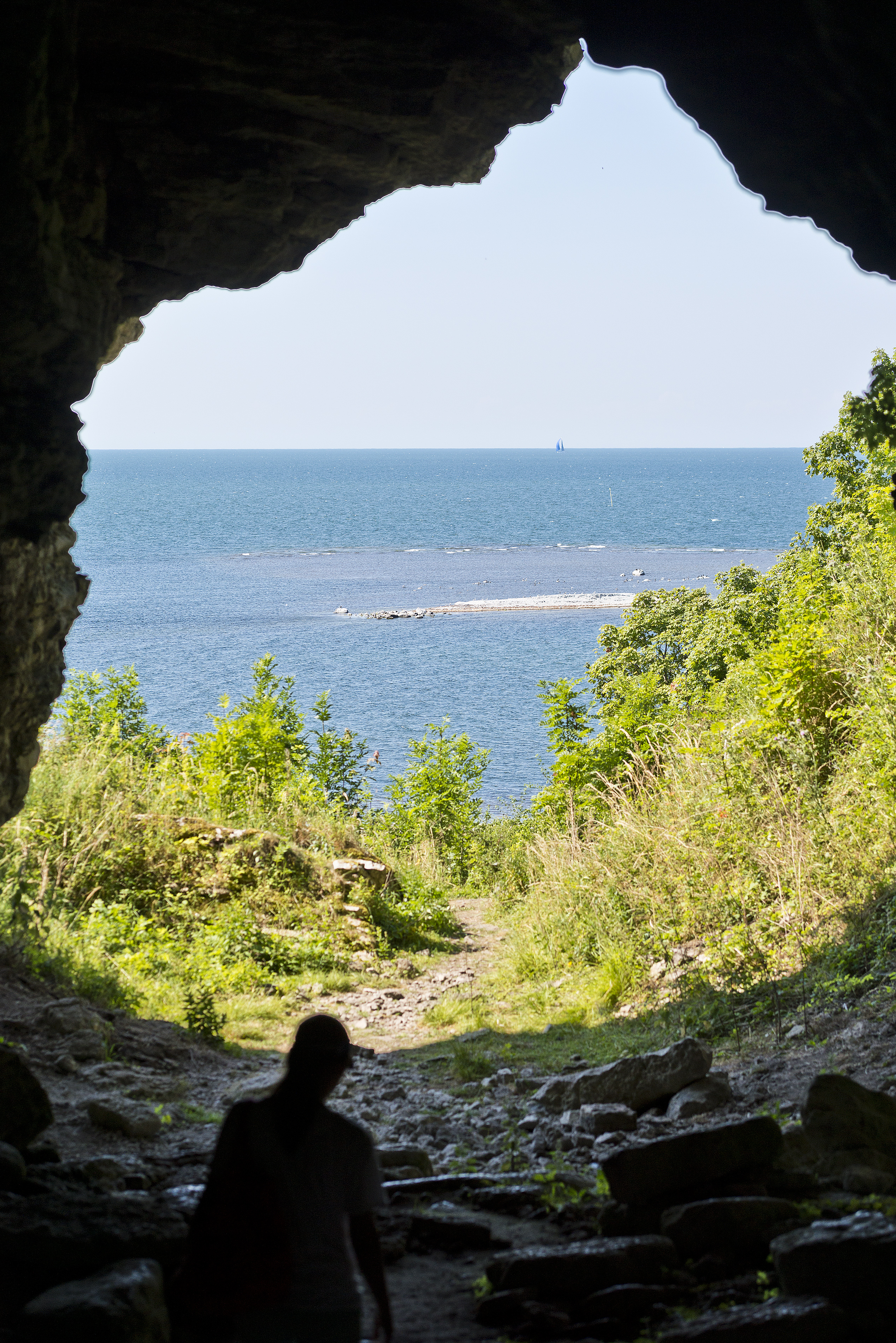
Stora Förvar, Stora Karlsö

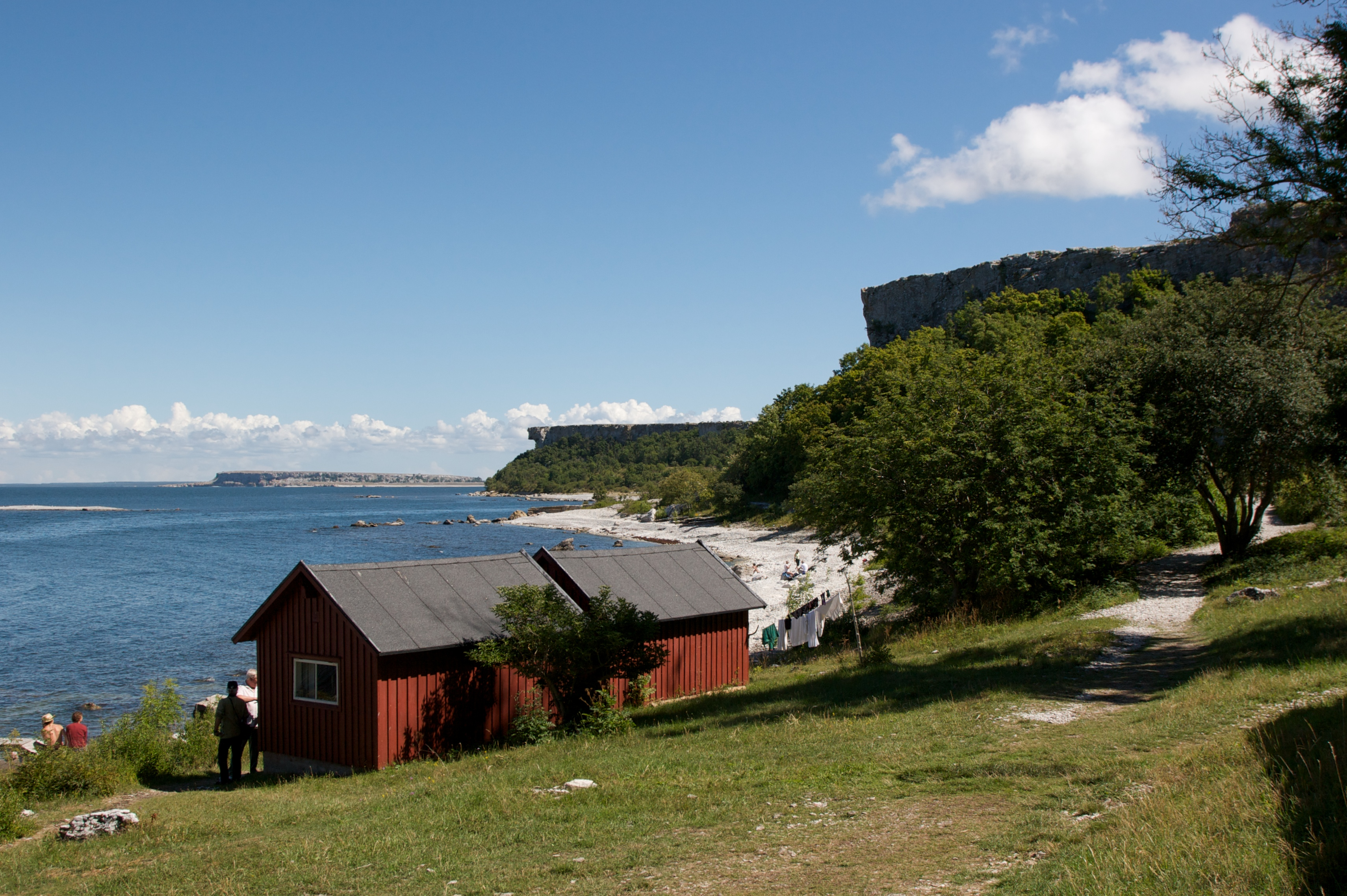
Stora Karlsö and Lilla Karlsö

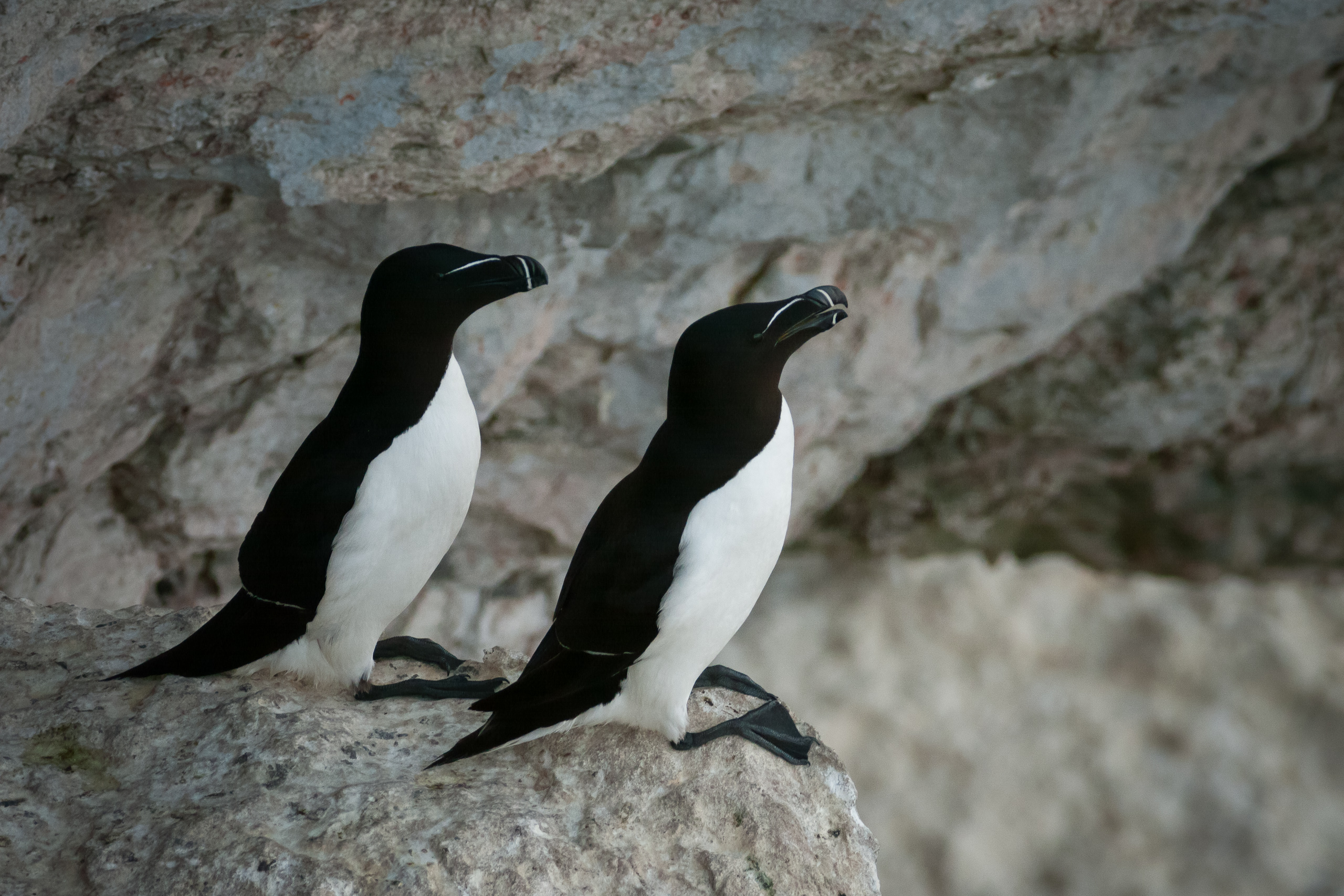
Razorbills

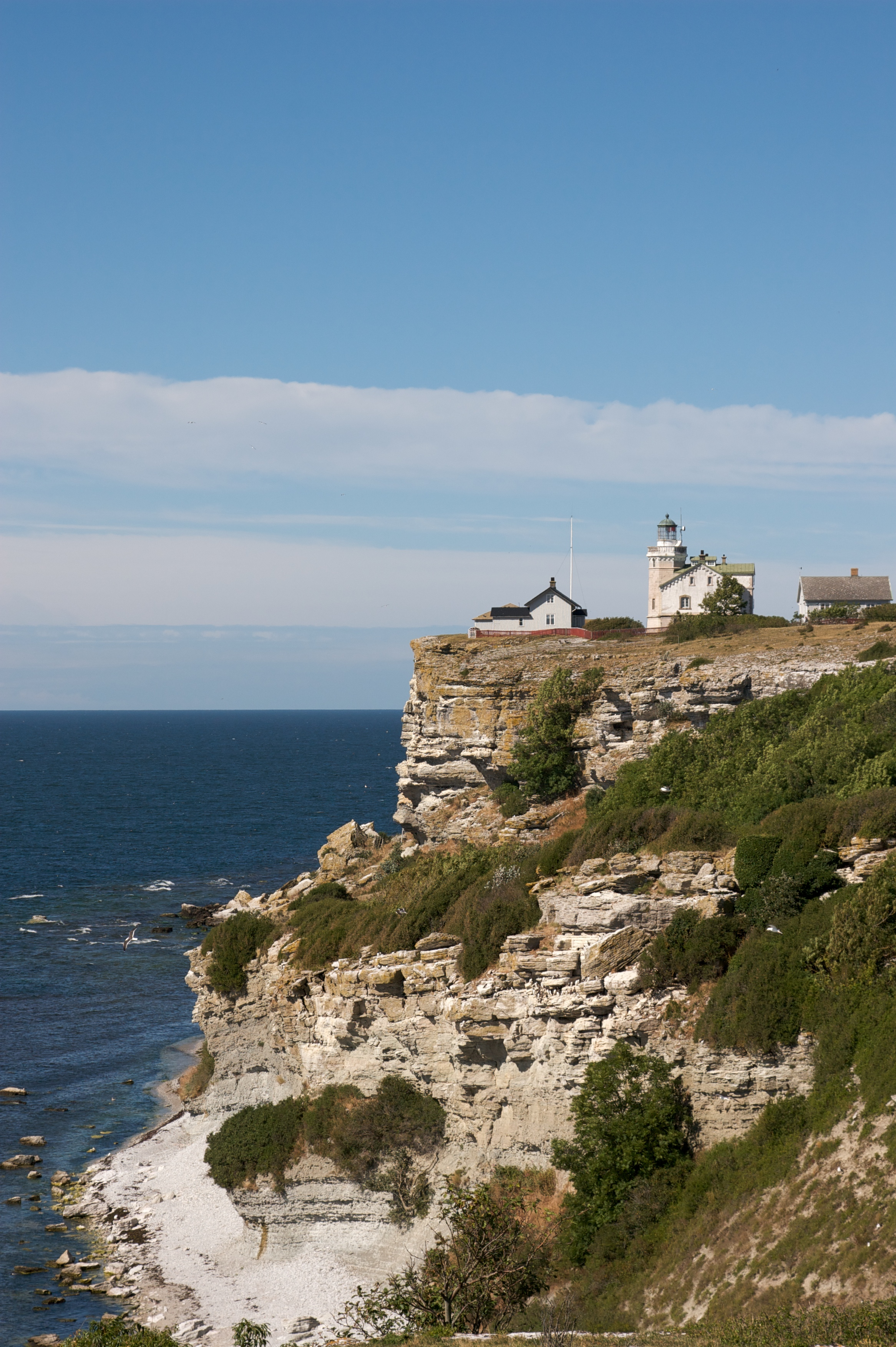
Limestone cliffs and lighthouse on Stora Karlsö

== See also ==
- Lilla Karlsö
- Svenska Turistföreningen
