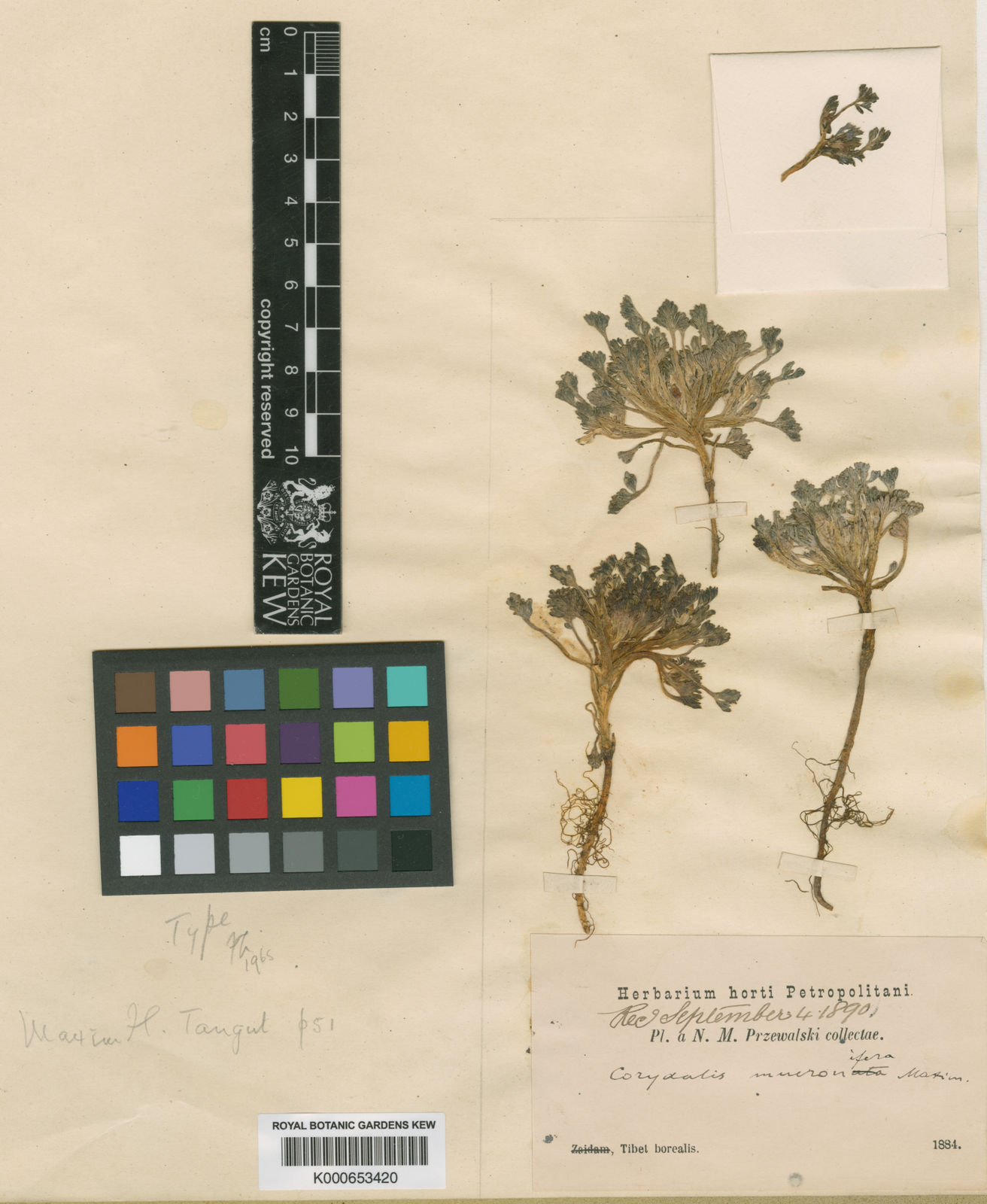
- Specimen of Corydalis mucronifera. (Ruler and color palette for reference).

Scientific classification
- Kingdom: Plantae
- Clade: Tracheophytes
- Clade: Angiosperms
- Clade: Eudicots
- Order: Ranunculales
- Family: Papaveraceae
- Genus: Corydalis
- Species: C. mucronifera

Binomial name
- Corydalis mucronifera Maxim.

= Corydalis mucronifera =

Species of flowering plant

Corydalis mucronifera is a species of flowering plant. It does not have a common name as it is quite rare in nature. This plant has also previously been recorded as Corydalis boweri. Being as rare as it is, it has only been found in two regions: China and Tibet. The range where the plant can be found is small as it is only found near rocky beaches or high mountain ranges at altitudes between 4200 and 5300 meters. Corydalis mucronifera is small in size (about 5 cm) and displays a variety of colors: purple, yellow, white, and cream. The plant has similar structures to other plants found in Europe and North America as it displays a racemose corymb. Due to its herbal properties, it is currently being studied in medicine for its inhibitory properties; these properties are focused in studies regarding neurodegenerative disorders.

== Morphology ==
Corydalis mucronifera is approximately 5 cm in height. Its appearance is cushion-like, with small hairs on its leaves (specifically on adolescent plants). Unlike other angiosperms where the stems branch off and are leafy, C. mucronifera has stems that originate from between the stem and the leaf. The base of the plant has roots that protrude from the stem in a taproot manner, consistent with its eudicot nature. Its roots consist of a central, large root, which is larger in diameter than the lateral roots. The lateral roots branch off from the taproot (primary roots), and subsequent lateral roots can branch off other lateral roots (secondary). These lateral roots originate from the pericycle of the plant.

The basal leaves of the plant have a few patterns. These leaves can be flat and oval in shape, with approximately 5 cm in length and 0.2-0.3 cm in width, attached to the stem with a flat petiole of approximately 4 cm in length. These leaves can also appear in a heart-shape with a length of approximately 1 cm and a width of about 1.2 cm. The leaves would be joined in groups of three, sharing a common point in a pinnated manner, or radiate outward in a star shape. Lateral lobes of the leaves are oblong in shape, shooting distally.

The stem leaves share a similar pattern to those in the base of the plant. The inflorescence has few flowers and follows a corymbose pattern, specifically, that of a racemose corymb, similar to Iberis umbellata (native to Europe and North America). This structure signifies that the pedicels of the lower flowers are longer than those of the upper flowers, making the inflorescence have a flat-topped appearance. Racemose corymb usually has 5 to 10 flowers that are whitish or cream-colored with a yellow apex.

The bracts of the plant are multilobed and are fan-shaped overall; they have a length of approximately 1.2 cm and a width of approximately 1 cm. They are pale to purplish at the base and green distally. The lobes themselves can have one of two shapes: linear or elliptic. At the ends of the lobes, there appears to be a short, bristle-point protrusion. There is often a total count of 7 to 13 of them. The peduncle is approximately 1 cm in length, and the tip of the fruit is hook-shaped. The sepals are about 0.1 cm in length and 0.2 cm in width with a toothed appearance. Any spurs are either straight or slightly downcurved, cylindric or narrowed toward the apex with a length of approximately 0.4–0.5 cm. The nectary extends through about two-thirds of the spur. The stigma has 4 or sometimes 5 apically stalked papillae. Within it is also a single (rare) geminate papilla on top.

The petals of the plant are distinct, where the outer petals have coronal protrusions and the upper petals are cylindrical. The upper petals are approximately 0.8 cm in length, slightly curved upward, and are found to be shorter than the outer petals. The capsule (fruit) is oval-shaped with a length of approximately 0.6 cm and a width of approximately 0.2 cm. Inside there are often 4 seeds, with a style extending approximately 0.2 cm in length, almost smooth or often papillate in shape.

== Distribution ==
Corydalis mucronifera is found in two distinct region classifications: mountain ranges and river basins. As of 2020, the recorded areas in which C. mucronifera has been found to include the Qinghai Province and the Tibet Autonomous Region. In mountain ranges, it is found in eastern Xinjiang, western Gansu, southern Qinghai, and northern Tibet. In lower altitudes, it is found near river basins, including the Yellow River basin, Qiantang River basin, Ritu River basin, and the Shuanghu River basin. Specific recording sites include Longmu Lake, Dongru, Namtso Lake, Gongtang, Lhasa, Amdo, Yanshiping, Jimai, Ayong Gama Lake, and Huashixia. According to documented collections of C. mucronifera, its occurrence increases from June to August, with August being the peak number of occurrences, with a decline following in September.

== Habitat and ecology ==
Corydalis mucronifera is a low growing perennial typically found near rocky beaches and high mountain ranges at altitudes between 4200 and 5300 meters. The plant prefers sandy, loamy, and well-drained soils, which can typically be found near river basins. In the 4000 m elevation zone, it is common to find it in well-weathered sand dunes, shielded by rocks, grasses, and bushes, like Salix. These consolidated sand dunes where high winds have left disturbed soils are the most common area for it to be spotted. Another common location in the 4000 m zone for C. mucronifera to be found is on the river basins flood plane, mixed in between pebbled terraces, weathered sands, and wet silt. C. mucronifera was also found on the higher edges of valleys at 4700 m, entrenched in water-logged soils. The well-drained soils of regions such as the Yellow River provide an ideal habitat for the plant. Corydalis mucronifera thrives in the Yellow River Basin in temperatures not exceeding 29 Celsius and is well adapted to precipitation zones ranging from 368mm/year to 600mm/yr.

== Medicinal uses ==
Although the prevalence of C. mucronifera is quite low, researchers have been able to isolate 24 specific compounds known as isoquinoline alkaloids contained in the plant. These compounds were found mainly through the use of NMR spectroscopy and X-ray diffraction, and 8 of the 24 compounds found were previously undiscovered and were named mucroniferanines H-M. Alkaloids, specifically isoquinoline alkaloids, are part of an extensive family of phytochemicals, which are found within a large amount of plants. They are known to occur naturally within families such as Papaveraceae, Berberidaceae, and Ranunculaceae.

When studying the isoquinoline alkaloids found specifically within the Corydalis mucronifera, researchers found that these compounds exhibited high levels of acetylcholinesterase inhibitory activity. Being inhibitors of such an enzyme, as shown by the activity of mentioned isoquinoline alkaloids, would generally limit the breakdown of acetylcholine. As acetylcholine is one of the major components of neurotransmission, a result of the application of these isoquinoline alkaloids is increase/less degradation of free acetylcholine. This should promote further transmission of neuronal signals when compared to baseline. Acetylcholinesterase inhibitors are currently prescribed to those with neurodegenerative disorders, as research suggests that they may be beneficial to reduce the severity of the symptoms associated. It is often that isoquinoline alkaloids are being used in research to aid those with Alzheimer's disease, as one of the issues with the body is the loss of cholinergic neurons.
