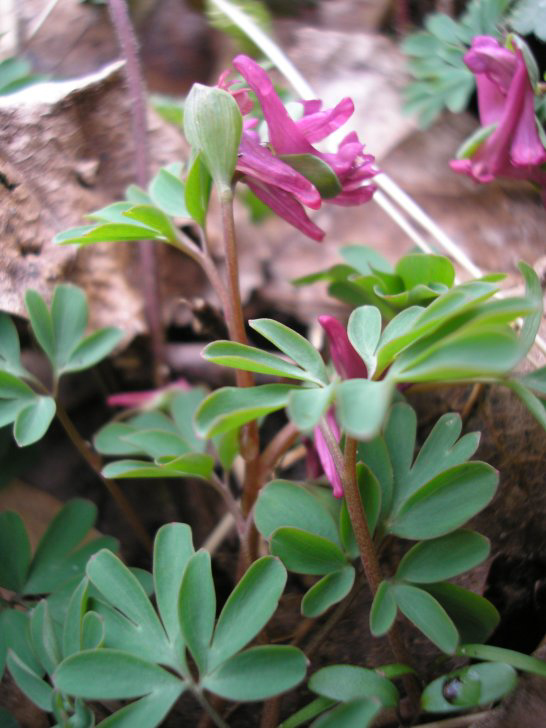

Scientific classification
- Kingdom: Plantae
- Clade: Tracheophytes
- Clade: Angiosperms
- Clade: Eudicots
- Order: Ranunculales
- Family: Papaveraceae
- Genus: Corydalis
- Species: C. intermedia

Binomial name
- Corydalis intermedia Mérat

= Corydalis intermedia =

Species of flowering plant

Corydalis intermedia is a species of flowering plant belonging to the family Papaveraceae.

It is native to Europe.
