= Lilla Karlsö =

Small Swedish island in the Baltic Sea

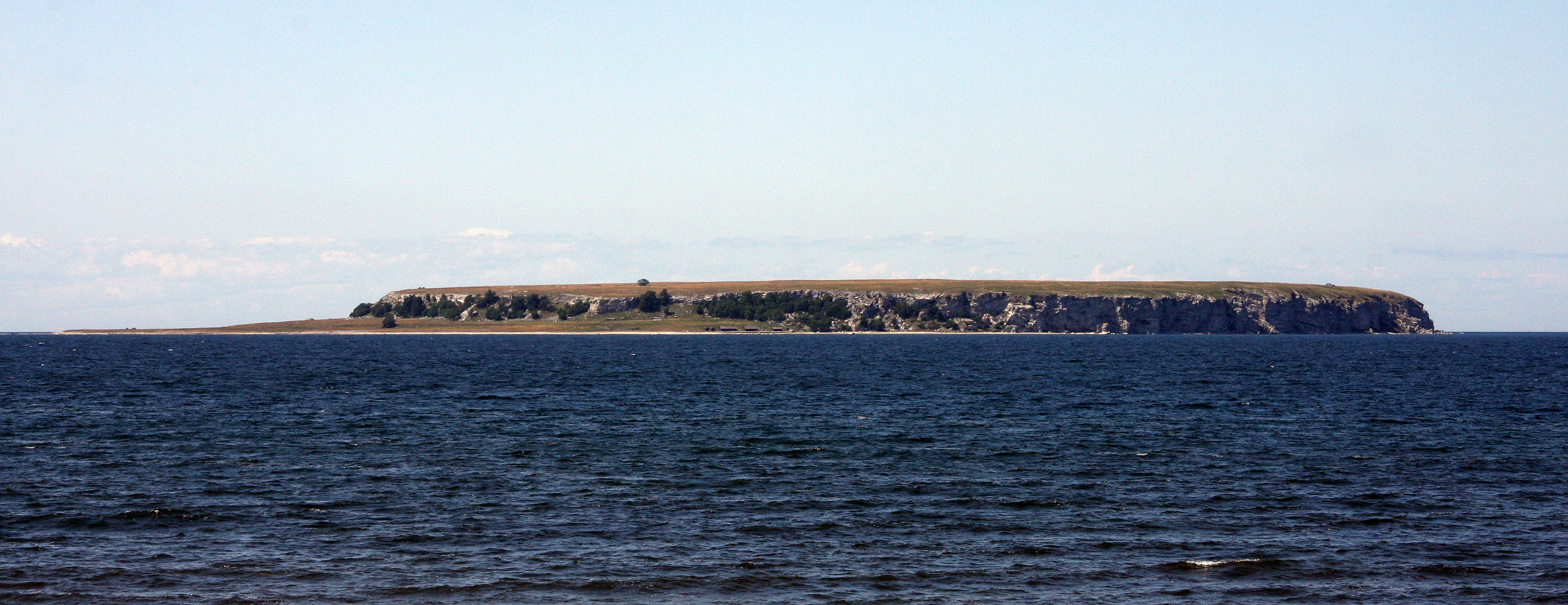
- Lilla Karslö seen from the sea

- Location within Gotland
- Interactive map of Lilla Karlsö

Geography
- Location: Baltic Sea
- Coordinates: 57°18′46″N 18°03′47″E
- Area: 1.5 km^{2} (0.58 sq mi)
- Highest elevation: 66 m (217 ft)

Administration
- Sweden

Additional information
- Official website: Lilla Karlsö

Lilla Karlsö (Little Karl island) is a small Swedish island in the Baltic Sea, situated about 3 km (1.9 mi) off the west coast of Gotland and 4.5 km (2.8 mi) from Stora Karlsö; it is part of Eksta socken. During summer there are tour boats from Djupvik 15 km (9.3 mi) south of Klintehamn.

== History ==
It is unclear when the first people began to settle on the Karlsö Islands. On Stora Karlsö, extensive evidence of human activity from various periods during the Stone Age has been found. Archaeological investigations conducted in the 2020s on Lilla Karlsö have also revealed prehistoric remains.

=== Mesolithic mother and fetus ===
During excavations in the Suder Vagnhus cave on the western side of Lilla Karlsö, archaeologists have found traces of Stone Age humans. In 2026, the discovery of a young pregnant woman was reported; she is estimated to have been buried between 8,000 and 9,500 years ago. A fetus was also found alongside her remains. According to archaeologist and project leader Alexander Roesen Sjöstrand, the find is unique in the world, and the fetus is unusually well-preserved and possibly one of the oldest preserved specimens ever found. Archaeological investigations of the site are still ongoing.

== Environment ==
The island has an area of about 1.6 km^{2} (0.62 mi^{2}) and is 66 m (217 ft) high. Most of the island consists of a limestone plateau. Parts of the shoreline are bordered by steep cliffs. The island is mostly covered by alvar. There are several caves and up to 16 m (52 ft) high limestone pillars.

=== Flora and fauna ===
Since 1954, the island has been owned by the Swedish Society for Nature Conservation and it is now a nature reserve. It is mostly known for its rich flora and birdlife. There is some old broadleaf forest, which is unique for Gotland, and several rare plants for Sweden such as Lactuca quercina (called 'Karlsösallat' in Swedish), hart's-tongue fern and Petrorhagia prolifera. There are also colonies of several thousand pairs of guillemots and razorbills. Along with neighbouring Stora Karlsö, the island has been designated an Important Bird Area (IBA) by BirdLife International.

== See also ==
- Stora Karlsö
- Gotland
