= Corydalis gotlandica =

Conservation status
- Near Threatened (IUCN 3.1)

Scientific classification
- Kingdom: Plantae
- Clade: Tracheophytes
- Clade: Angiosperms
- Clade: Eudicots
- Order: Ranunculales
- Family: Papaveraceae
- Genus: Corydalis
- Species: C. gotlandica

Binomial name
- Corydalis gotlandica Lidén

Species of flowering plant

Corydalis gotlandica is a species of flowering plant belonging to the family Papaveraceae.

It is endemic to Gotland (Sweden).
