= List of churches and chapels on Gotland =

The Swedish island of Gotland has since the early Middle Ages had a large number of churches and chapels.

== Medieval churches ==
There are 92 medieval churches on Gotland; the island has more well-preserved medieval churches than any other part of Sweden. The medieval churches of Gotland constitute a coherent group of medieval architecture and is therefore listed in a separate article.

== Churches and chapels of Gotland ==
Name	Main construction period	Coordinates	Image	Notes	References
Gnisvärd Chapel	1839	57°30′26″N 18°06′44″E			
Gotska Sandön Chapel		58°23′19.3″N 19°11′47.5″E			
Hallshuk Chapel		57.9250°N 18.7424°E			
Kovik Chapel	1963	57°24′33″N 18°09′53″E			
Pentecostal Church of Visby	1988	57°37′39″N 18°18′09″E		The church belongs to the Swedish Pentecostal Movement. It has been in use since 1988.	
Slite Church	1960	57°42′26″N 18°47′45″E		The church was designed by the Danish architect Holger Jensen and built 1959–1960. It is built using only local materials. It has sculptures made by a local artist, Bertil Nyström.	
Terra Nova Church		57°36′48.26″N 18°18′41.47″E		The church dates from 1983 and was designed by architect Hans Wieland. It was inaugurated by Bishop Tore Furberg.	
Vibble Chapel		57°36′02.3″N 18°14′59.3″E			
Visborg Church	1969	57°37′28″N 18°17′06″E		Visborg Church was built in 1969, to designs by architect Per Erik Nilsson.	
Visby Catholic Church	1982	57°38′31″N 18°17′43″E		The church, which was inaugurated by Bishop Hubertus Brandenburg in 1982, it is the first Catholic church to be built on Gotland since the Middle Ages. It lies in the centre of Visby.	
Vårdklockan Church	1875	57°38′18″N 18°17′44″E		Belonging to the Uniting Church in Sweden	

=== Bibliography ===
- Lagerlöf, Erland, ed. (1973). Gotlands kyrkor (in Swedish). Uddevalla: Rabén & Sjögren. ISBN 9129410355.
