= Tofta, Gotland =

Tofta
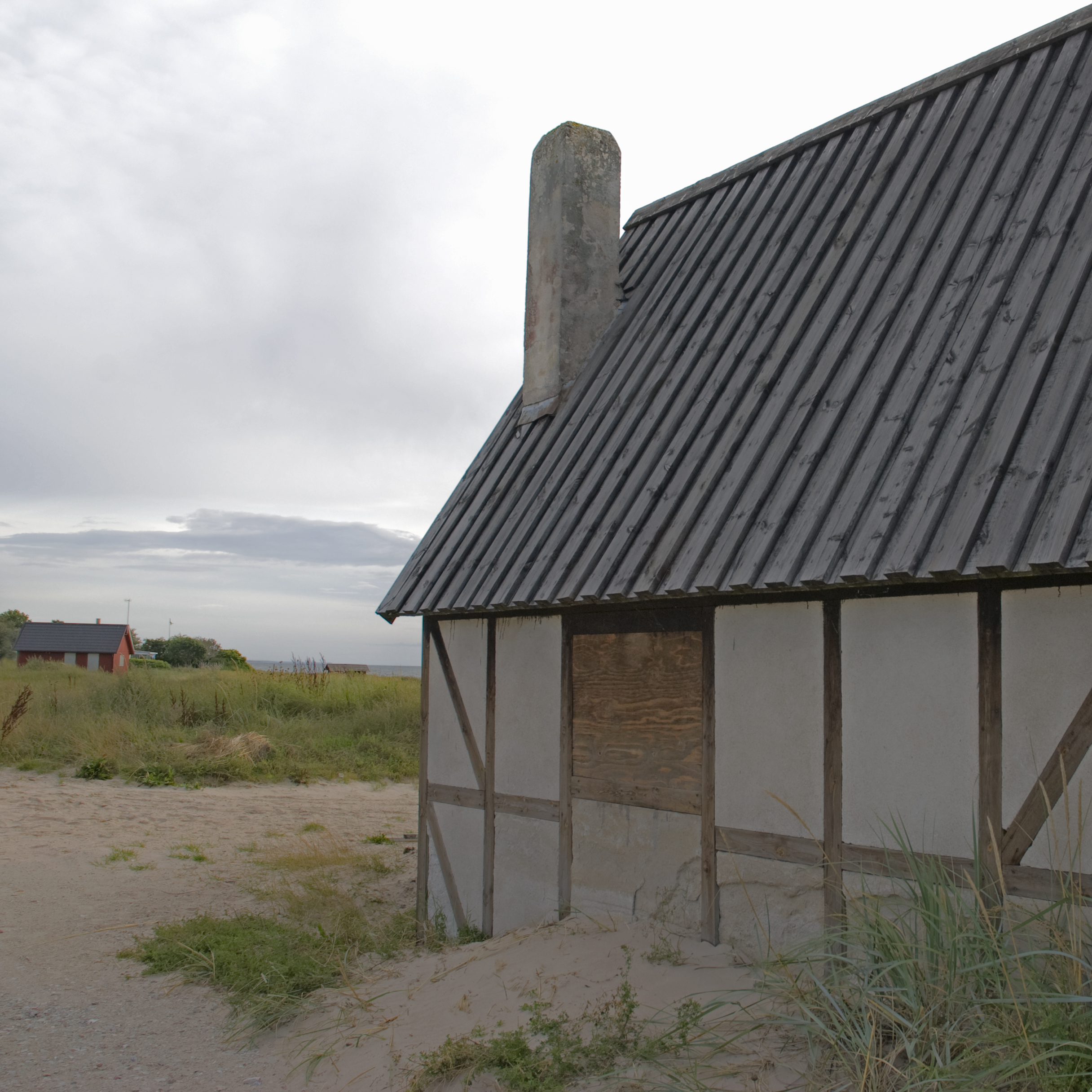
- Cottage by the Tofta beach

- Location within Gotland
- Coordinates: 57°31′16″N 18°10′7″E
- Country: Sweden
- Province: Gotland
- County: Gotland County
- Municipality: Gotland Municipality

Area
  - Total: 38.19 km^{2} (14.75 sq mi)

Population (2014)
  - Total: 508
- Time zone: UTC+1 (CET)
  - Summer (DST): UTC+2 (CEST)

Tofta, also known as Gotlands Tofta, is a populated area, a socken (not to be confused with parish), on the Swedish island of Gotland. It comprises the same area as the administrative Tofta District, established on 1 January 2016.

Tofta is most noted for its long, sandy beach. In the north part of Tofta is a military firing range.

== Geography ==
Tofta is the name of the socken as well as the district. It is also the name of the small 0.3 km^{2} (0.12 mi^{2}) village surrounding the medieval Tofta Church, also known as Tofta kyrkby. Tofta is on the central west coast of Gotland, situated on a high rocky plateau mostly covered in pine forest, 48%, while 22% of the area is used as farmland.

In the northwest part of Tofta, between the coastline and road 140, is the Tofta firing range (Tofta Skjutfält). It is a military compound, approximately 6 by 2 km (3.7 by 1.2 mi), used for training with live ammunition, tanks, artillery and land mines. Once a year, the Gotland Grand National, the world's largest enduro race, is held on the range.

On the Tofta coast are two old fishing villages; Blåhäll to the north and Gnisvärd a bit further south. Blåhäll has several caves and Gnisvärd has some of the grandest stone ships on Gotland. Inland is the Smågårde village. Tofta is most noted for the long sandy beach along the southern coastline. It is the second largest and most visited, on Gotland after the Sudersand beach on Fårö.

As of 2019, Tofta Church belongs to Eskelhem-Tofta parish in Eskelhems pastorat, along with the churches in Eskelhem and Gnisvärd.

One of the asteroids in the asteroid belt, 11308 Tofta, is named after this place.

== History ==
The village of Tofta dates from Medieval times. The oldest preserved text where the name is mentioned, is from 1304. The name may be related to the Swedish word toft, meaning thwart.

In the greater Tofta area, there are a number of remnants from earlier eras. During excavations, Stone Age settlements and a cist has been found. There are stone ships and grave mounds from the Bronze Age, and from The Iron Age there are 23 grave fields, groove stones, stone walls, a picture stone and a hillfort. There are also runes chiseled on a stone in the church. The stone is from 1170–90, and is a more likely to have been a tombstone than a runestone dedicated to a man called Röde Orm ("Red Snake"), a common name at that time.

== Places of interest ==
A reconstruction of a Viking village has been made in Tofta, where visitors can try out life during the Viking age.

The Gotland Grand National, the world's largest enduro race, was held annually at Tofta firing range from 1984 to 2023 before being relocated to Hejdeby.

== Gallery ==
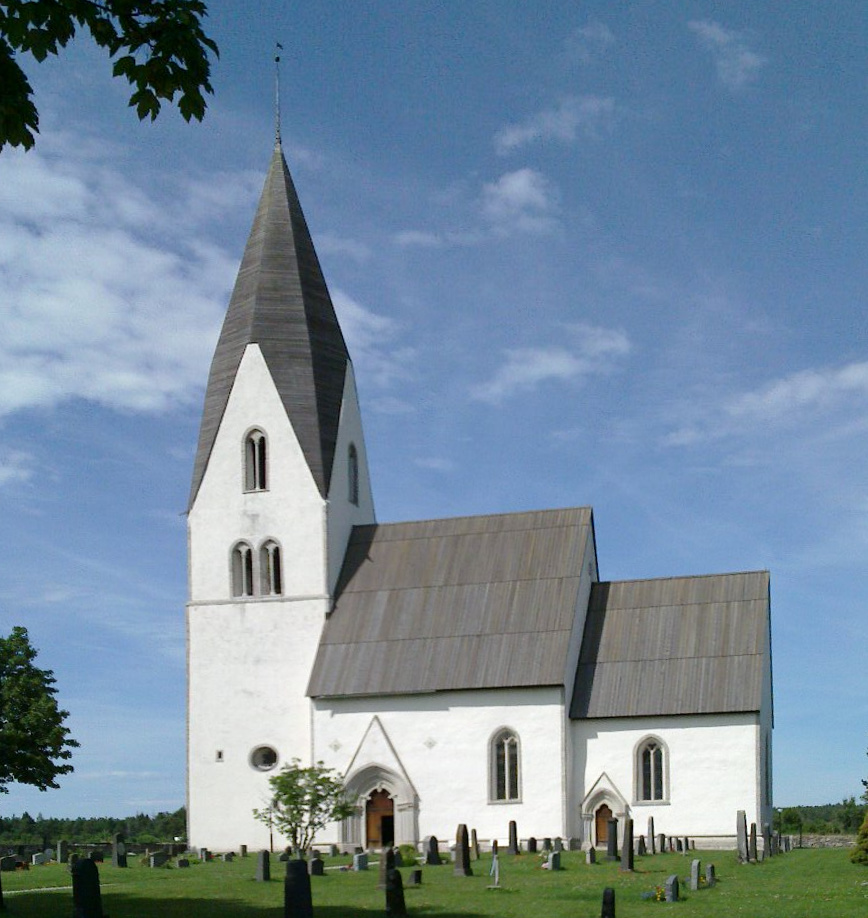
Tofta Church

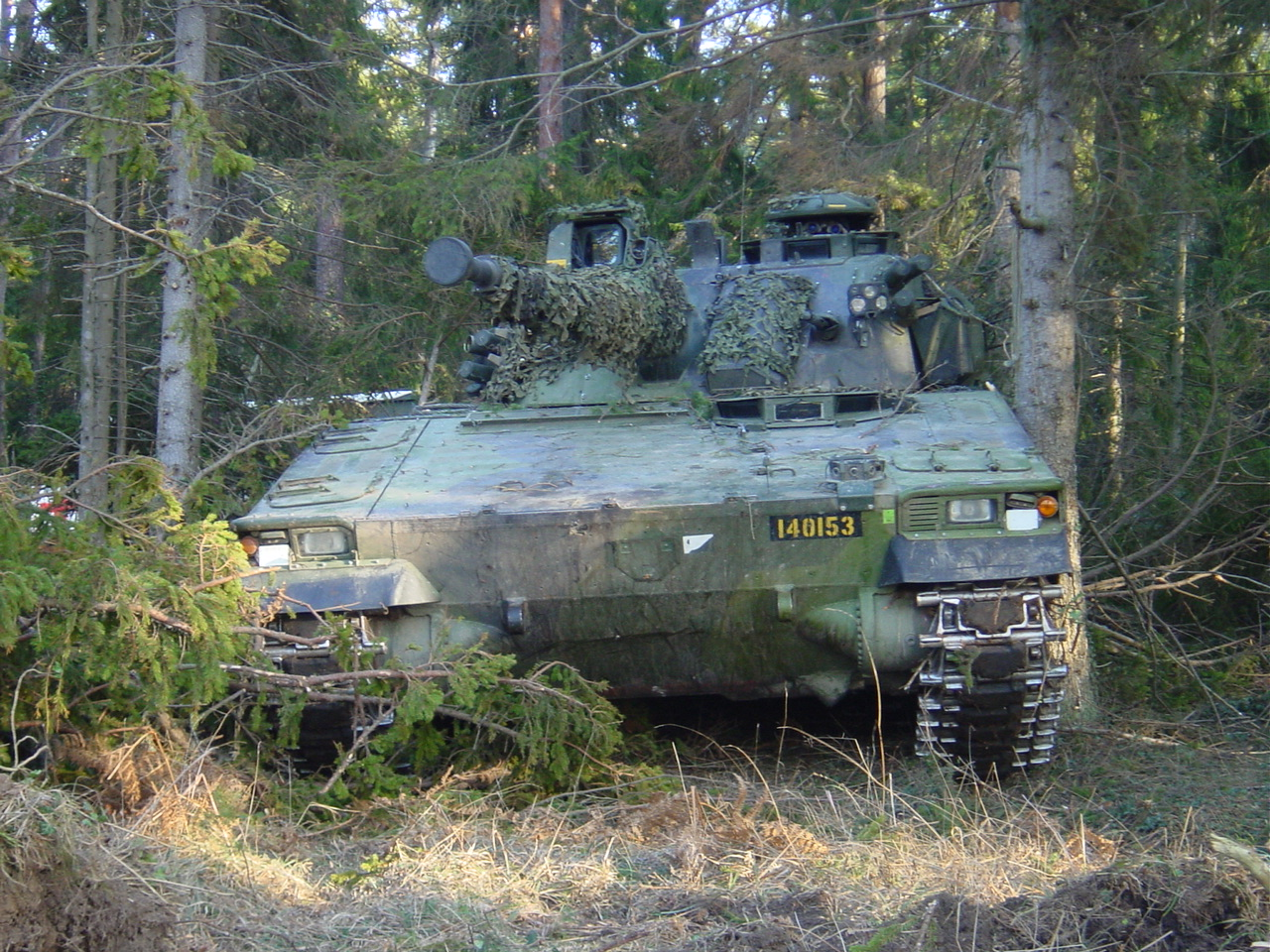
Tank on Tofta firing range

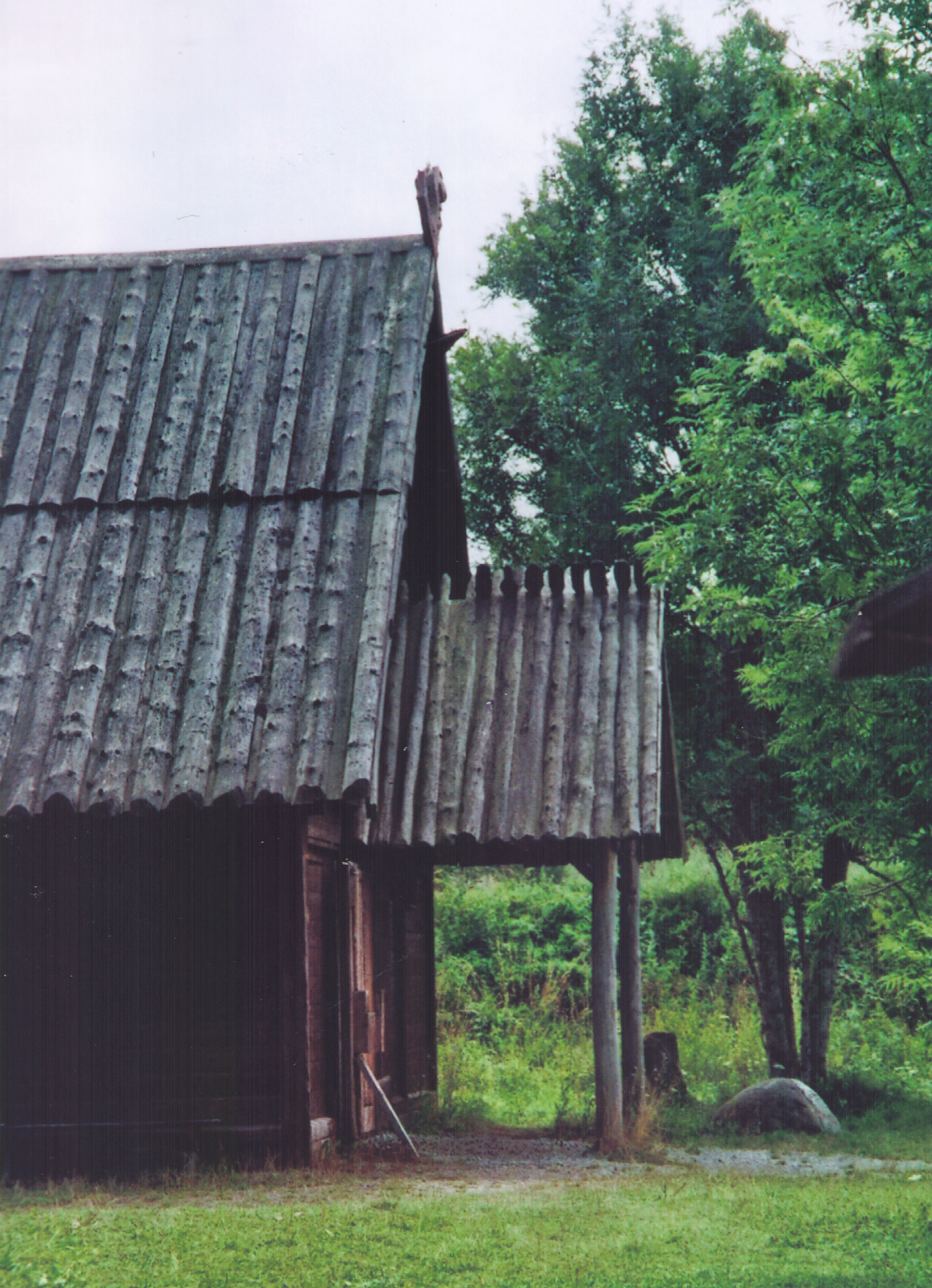
Tofta Viking village

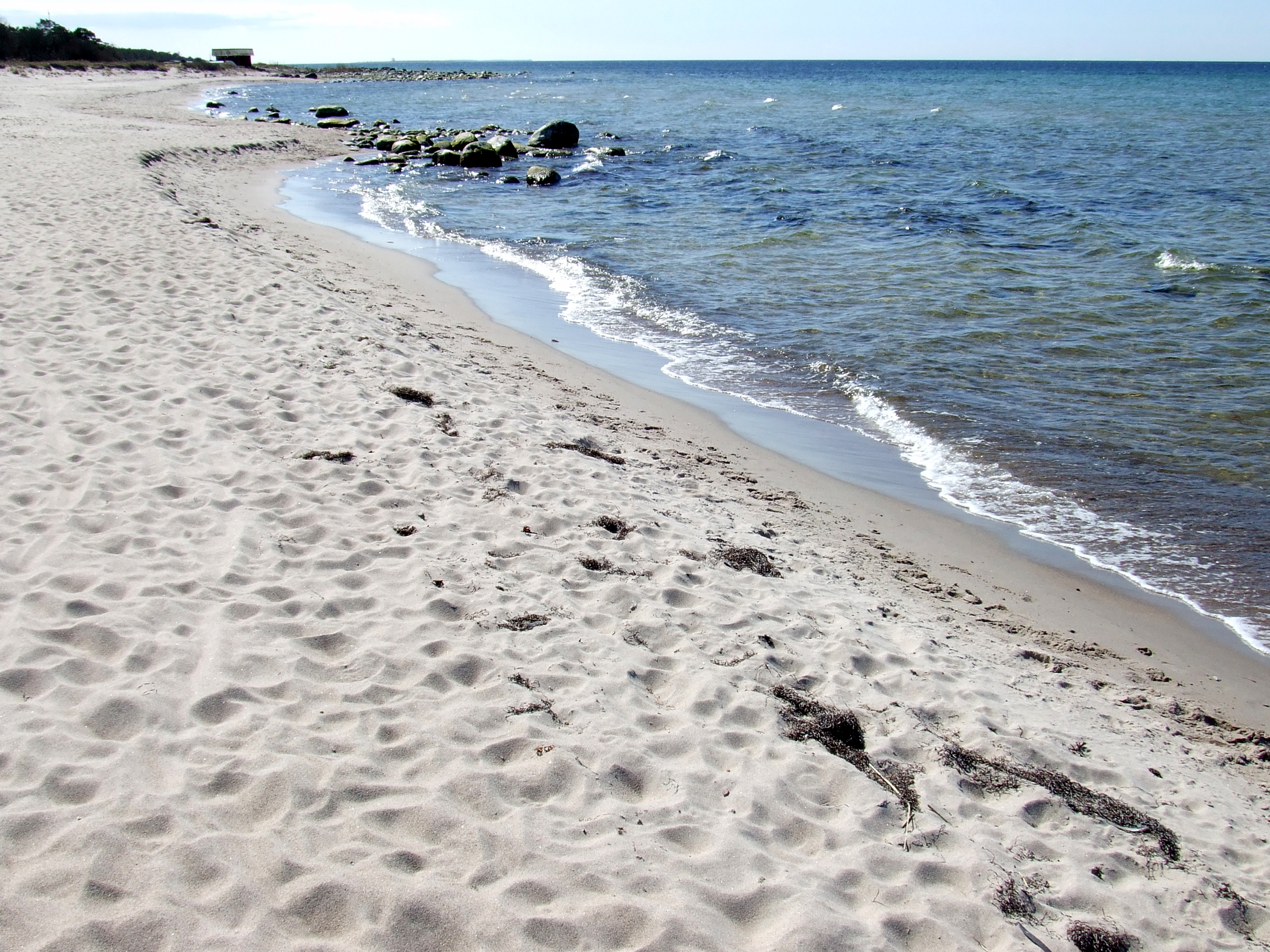
Tofta beach
