= Gotland Grand National =

Enduro
- Venue: Tofta firing range (1984–2023); Hejdeby (2024–present)
- Location: Hejdeby, Gotland
- First race: 1984
- Most wins (rider): Mats Nilsson (8)

The Gotland Grand National is an enduro race on the Swedish island of Gotland. It is considered the largest enduro competition in the world, drawing over three thousand riders annually.

Debuting in 1984, the race was long held at the Tofta firing range. It was moved to the socken of Hejdeby in 2024.

It takes place every All Saints' Day weekend. The GGN is part of the Svensk Enduroklassiker ("Swedish Enduro Classic") alongside the Stångebroslaget and Ränneslättsloppet.

== History ==
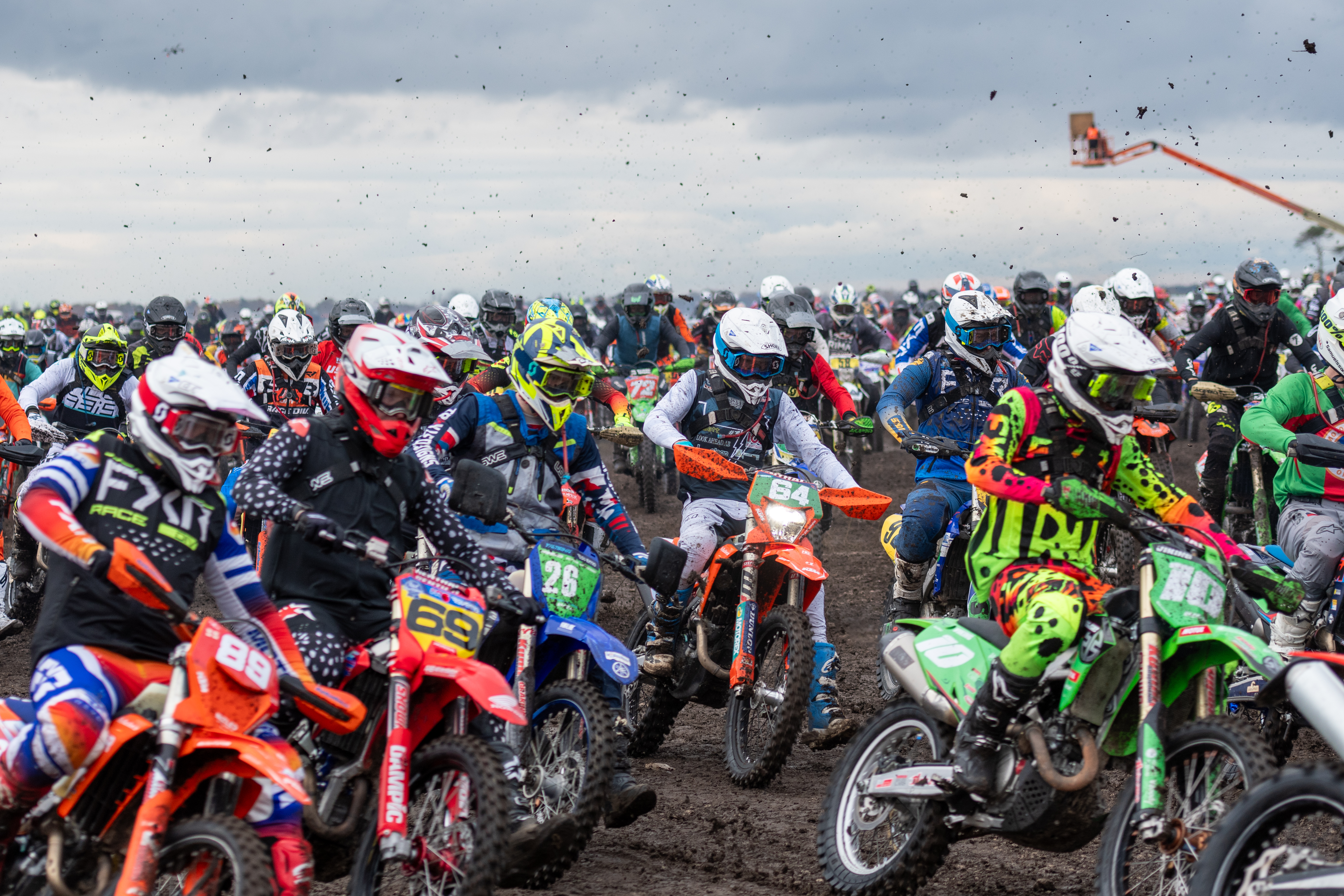
Start of the 2023 race

The Gotland Grand National was founded in 1984 by GMF Bysarna and the Voluntary Motorcycle Corps with support from officers in the Gotland Regiment.

The 2000 race saw over two thousand entrants for the first time. In 2016, a record 3,172 riders took part.

Gotland joined the new World Enduro Super Series in 2018 as the penultimate of eight rounds.

Since Tofta is a military training ground, the land was leased to the GGN by the Swedish Fortifications Agency once the dates were approved by the Swedish Armed Forces. After the 2023 race, the GGN left Tofta since the Army needed the area for their increasing activities following the 2022 Russian invasion of Ukraine. It was moved to Hejdeby, where it was formally dubbed the Gotland Grand National 2.0.

== Past winners ==
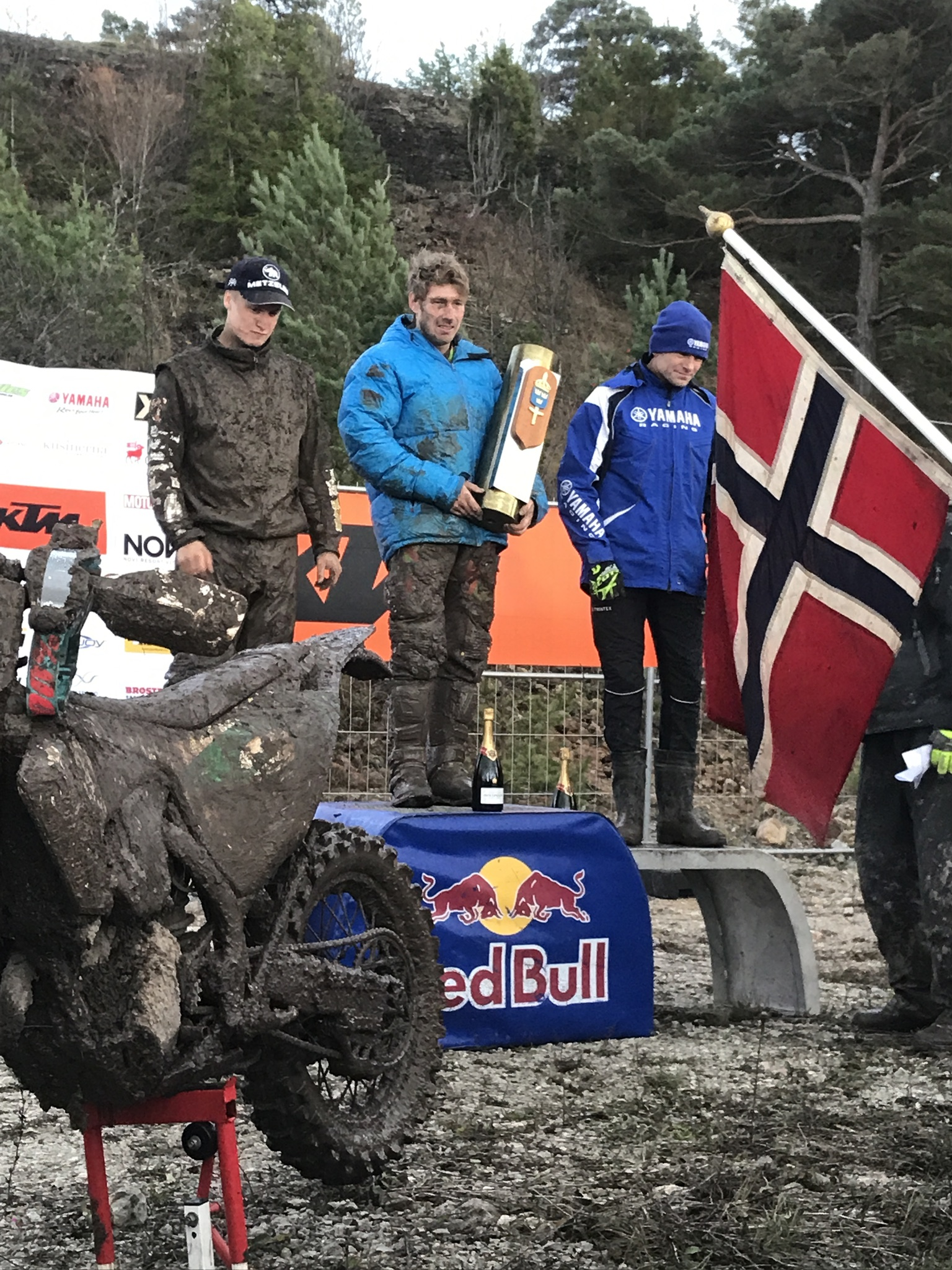
The 2017 podium with Kjertil Gundersen

Year	Rider		Ref
Year	Men	Women	Ref
1984	Per Grönberg	Not awarded	
1985	Dick Wicksell	Not awarded	
1986	Peter Hansson	Not awarded	
1987	Thomas Gustavsson	Not awarded	
1988	Peter Hansson	Not awarded	
1989	Peter Hansson	Not awarded	
1990	Dick Wicksell	Not awarded	
1991	Joakim Hedendahl	Not awarded	
1992	Joakim Hedendahl	Not awarded	
1993	Peter Hansson	Not awarded	
1994	Joakim Hedendahl	Not awarded	
1995	Joakim Hedendahl	Not awarded	
1996	Joakim Hedendahl	Not awarded	
1997	Mats Nilsson	Not awarded	
1988	Joakim Hedendahl	Not awarded	
1999	Kenneth Gundersen	Not awarded	
2000	Kenneth Gundersen	Not awarded	
2001	Jonas Edberg	Not awarded	
2002	Mats Nilsson	Not awarded	
2003	Kenneth Gundersen	Not awarded	
2004	Mats Nilsson	Not awarded	
2005	Samuli Arto	Not awarded	
2006	Mats Nilsson	Not awarded	
2007	Mats Nilsson	Not awarded	
2008	Mats Nilsson	Not awarded	
2009	Mats Nilsson	Not awarded	
2010	Mats Nilsson	Not awarded	
2011	Pierre-Alexandre Renet	Not awarded	
2012	Pierre-Alexandre Renet	Not awarded	
2013	Pierre-Alexandre Renet	Katrine Rye-Holmboe	
2014	Pierre-Alexandre Renet	Frida Östlund	
2015	Josh Strang	Emmily Smalsjö	
2016	Kenneth Gundersen	Emmily Smalsjö	
2017	Kjertil Gundersen	Martina Reimander	
2018	Albin Elowson	Hanna Berzelius	
2019	Filip Bengtsson	Hanna Berzelius	
2020	Mikael Persson	Matilda Ahlström	
2021	Mikael Persson	Matilda Huss	
2022	Albin Elowson	Tyra Bäckström	
2023	Albin Elowson	Linnéa Åkesson	
2024	Max Ahlin	Martine Hughes	
2025	Max Ahlin	Hedveg Malm	
2026	Max Ahlin	Shelby Turner	
