= Hejdeby Church =

- Hejdeby kyrka
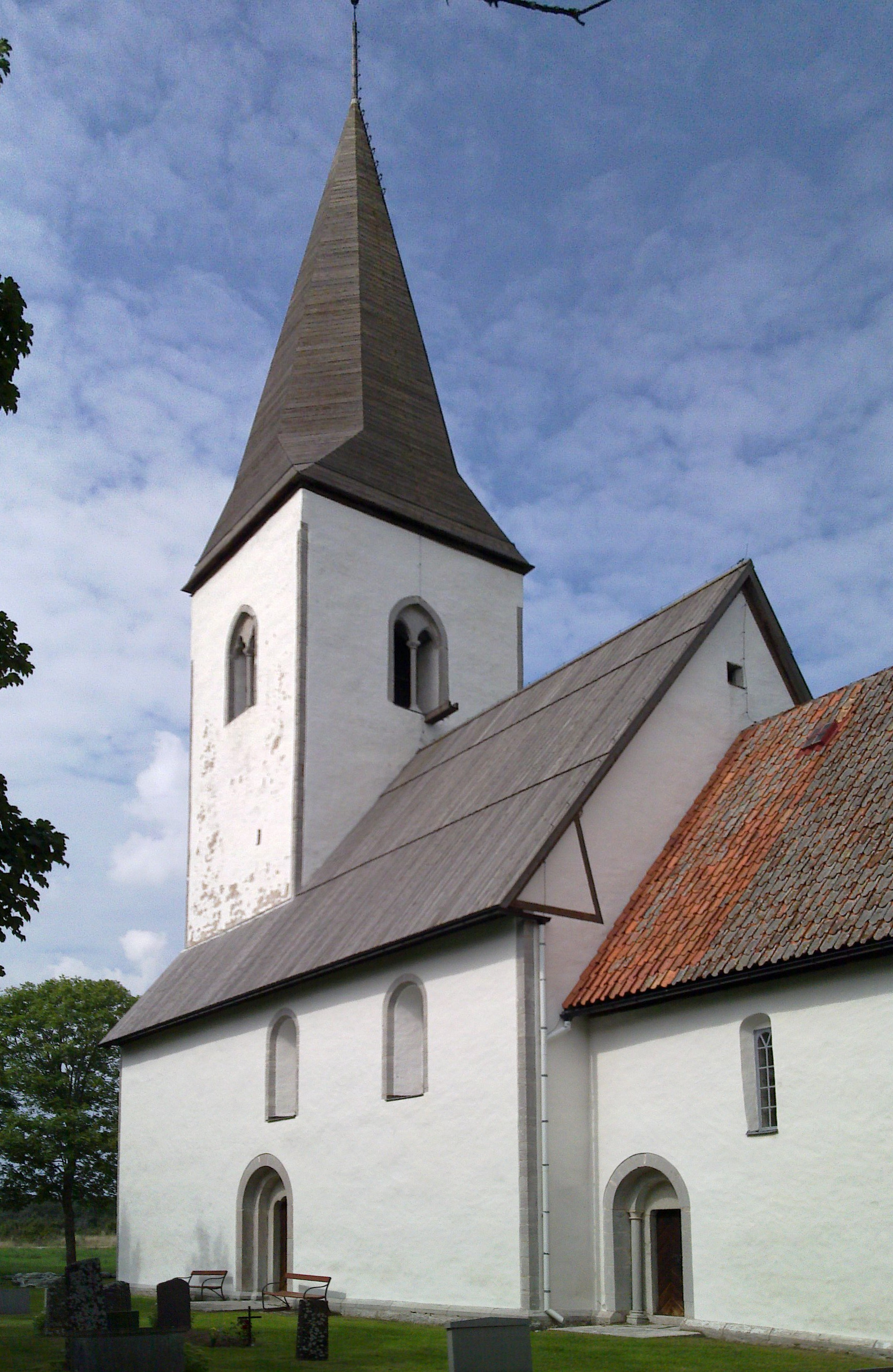
- Hejdeby Church, view of the exterior

- Location on Gotland
- 57°37′49″N 18°26′34″E
- Country: Sweden
- Denomination: Church of Sweden

Administration
- Diocese: Visby

Hejdeby Church (Swedish: Hejdeby kyrka) is a medieval church in Hejdeby on the Swedish island of Gotland. The church was built in stages during the 13th century, and contains medieval murals from two different periods. Hejdeby Church is part of the Diocese of Visby within the Church of Sweden.

== History and architecture ==
The church was built in the 13th century, the choir and nave first (in late Romanesque style) and the tower last (showing early Gothic influences).

The interior of the church is richly decorated with medieval murals. These date from two periods: the oldest are from the 13th century and depict apostles, the crowning of Mary, and various saints. The other set of murals date from the 15th century and depict scenes from the Passion of Christ. The church also has a triumphal cross dating from the early 13th century, a medieval baptismal font complete with its richly carved wooden lid, and an unusual medieval wooden bench. Other original furnishings are now in a museum in Visby.
