= Eskelhem =

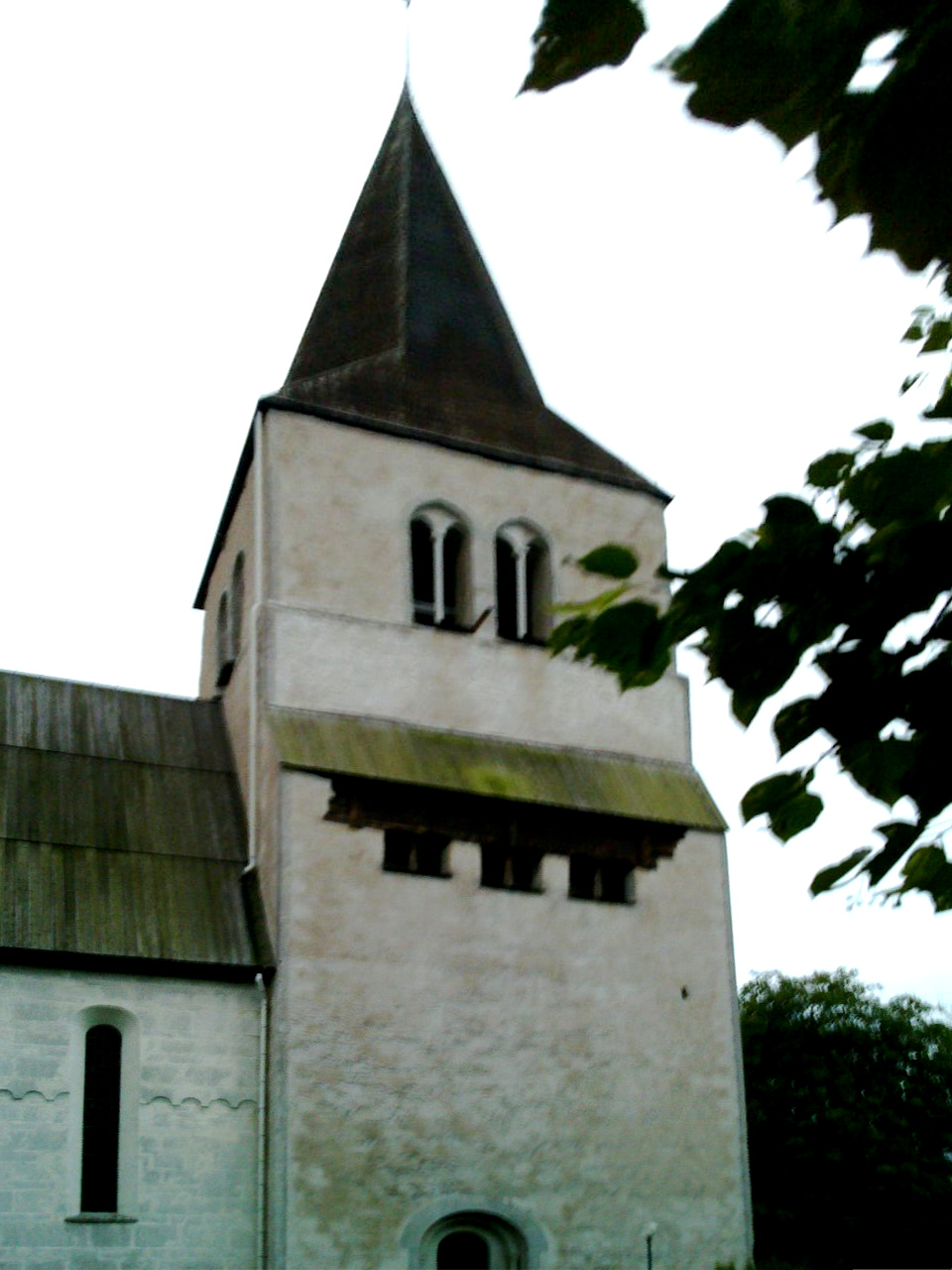
- Eskelhem Church

- Location within Gotland
- Coordinates: 57°29′22″N 18°12′35″E
- Country: Sweden
- Province: Gotland
- County: Gotland County
- Municipality: Gotland Municipality

Area
  - Total: 37.78 km^{2} (14.59 sq mi)

Population (2014)
  - Total: 729
- Time zone: UTC+1 (CET)
  - Summer (DST): UTC+2 (CEST)

Eskelhem is a populated area, a socken (not to be confused with parish), on the Swedish island of Gotland. The area is rural with farms. It comprises the same area as the administrative Eskelhem District, established on 1 January 2016.

== Geography ==
Eskelhem is the name of the socken as well as the district. It is also the name of the small village surrounding the medieval Eskelhem Church, sometimes referred to as Eskelhem kyrkby. It is in the west part of central Gotland, south of Visby. The area consists of a farmed plain surrounded by forests. The area of the socken is 37.78 km^{2} (14.59 mi^{2}) of which 37.62 km^{2} (14.53 mi^{2}) is land.

As of 2019, Eskelhem Church belongs to Eskelhem-Tofta parish in Eskelhems pastorat, along with the churches in Tofta and Gnisvärd.

== History ==
The earliest archaeological finds in Eskelhem are remains of Stone Age settlements. There are also several Bronze Age grave mounds and cairns. The most significant find, a Bronze Age horse harness, was made in a mound by the rectory. Sixteen grave fields and three hillforts from the Iron Age are within the boundaries of the socken. Stones with grind grooves have also been found. A total of about 600 archaeological sites have been found at Eskelhem.

The history of the present-day locality goes back to the Middle Ages. It is referred to in Medieval rune inscription as yskilaim. The meaning of the first part of the name is unclear and the last part haim or hem means "dwelling", "farm" or in this case "settlement".

In 1897, a railway was built from Klintehamn to Romakloster for transporting sugar beets to the sugar refinery in Roma. One of the stations along that line was Tjuls in Eskelhem, where a station house was built. The station was in use until 1953, when the passenger service on the line ceased. During that time, five station masters, three of which were women, served at Tjuls. The railway continued in operation for goods traffic until 1960. Today, the station house is a small railway museum.
