= Tofta Church, Gotland =

Tofta Church
- Tofta kyrka
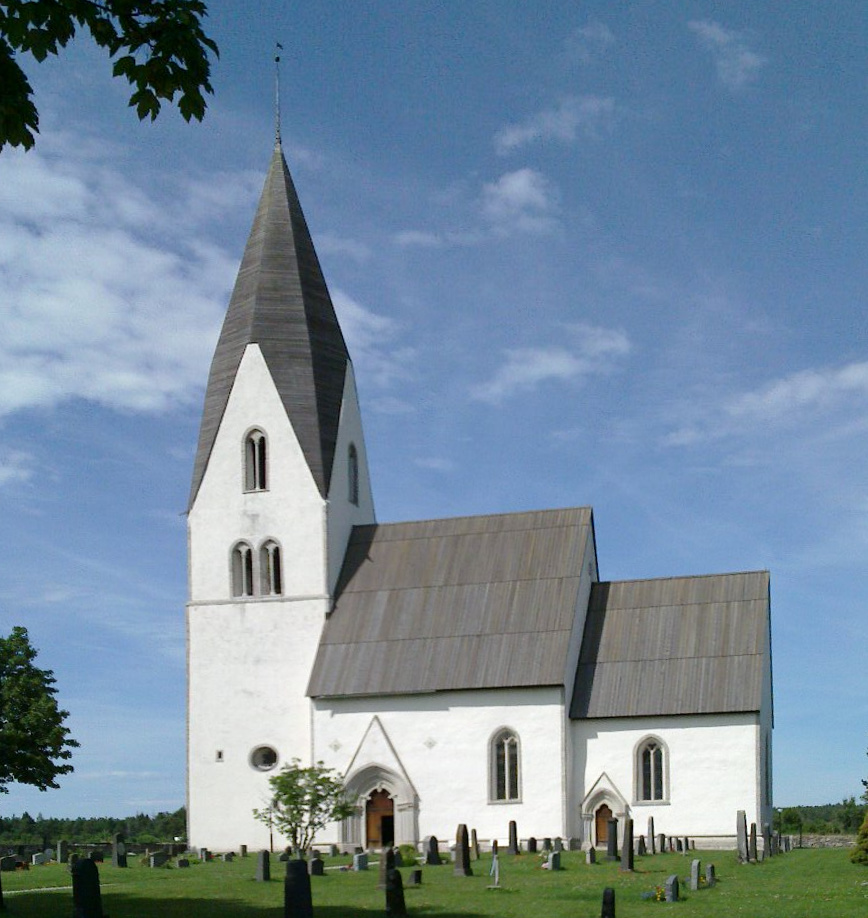
- Tofta Church, view of the exterior

- Location on Gotland
- 57°31′18″N 18°10′07″E
- Location: Tofta
- Country: Sweden
- Denomination: Church of Sweden

Administration
- Diocese: Visby

Tofta Church (Swedish: Tofta kyrka) is a medieval church in Tofta on the Swedish island of Gotland. It belongs to the Church of Sweden and lies in the Diocese of Visby.

== History and architecture ==
The earliest church on this location was probably built during the end of the 12th century; of this first church however nothing remains. The oldest part of the presently visible church is the tower. The nave and choir both date from the middle of the 14th century. The church walls display fragments of medieval murals that were found during a restoration in 1958-1959. A few medieval stained glass windows are likewise preserved in the church.

Of the furnishings, the baptismal font is the oldest, dating from the 12th century and richly sculpted. It was probably made for the earliest church. The high altar has a retable from the 14th century, probably made in Lübeck. Two other wooden sculptures from the same century are also preserved in the church, one of the Virgin Mary and one of St. Olaf. An unusually well-preserved medieval bench also stands in the church. In the floor of the choir is a gravestone, made for a farmer and his son who were beaten to death in 1340. The pews and the pulpit date from the Baroque era.

In 2004, an extremely well-preserved mail coif was discovered in a room in the tower during cleaning of the church. Reputedly it is one of the most well-preserved mail coifs ever found in Europe, second only to a similar one displayed at the National Museum of Scotland. It may be connected to a civil war that was fought on the island in 1288. The mail coif is now displayed inside Tofta Church.

== Gallery ==
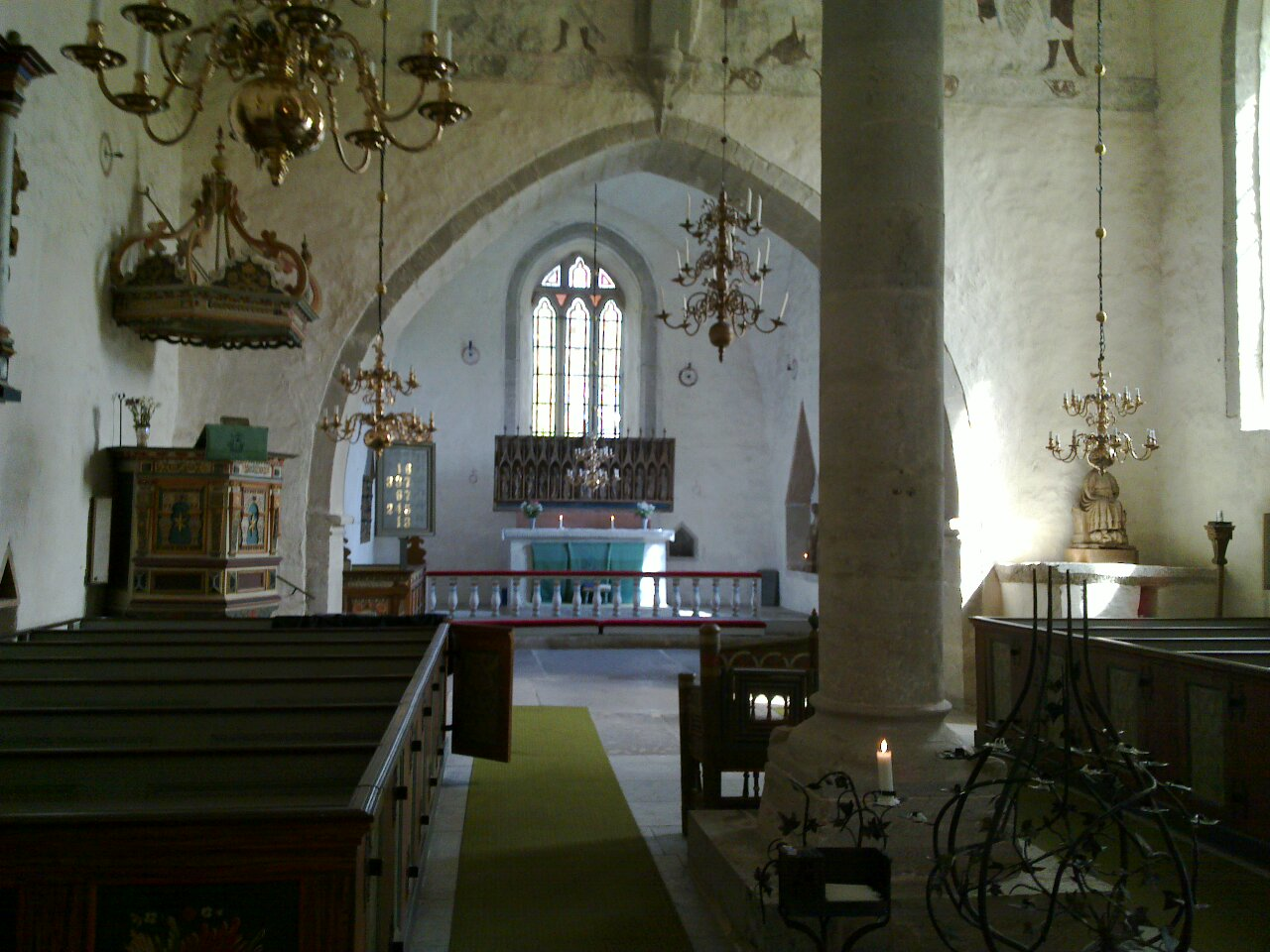
Inside of the Tofta Church.

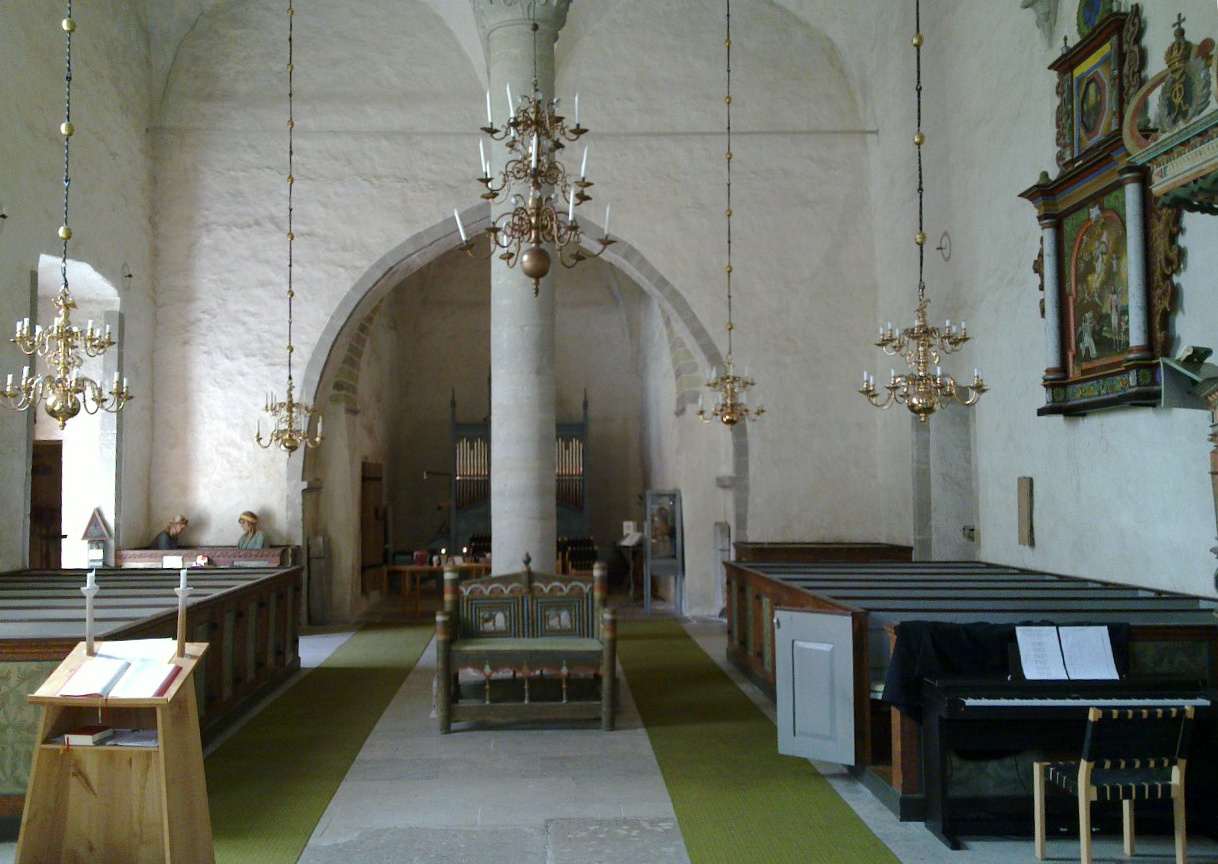
Interior of the church to the west.

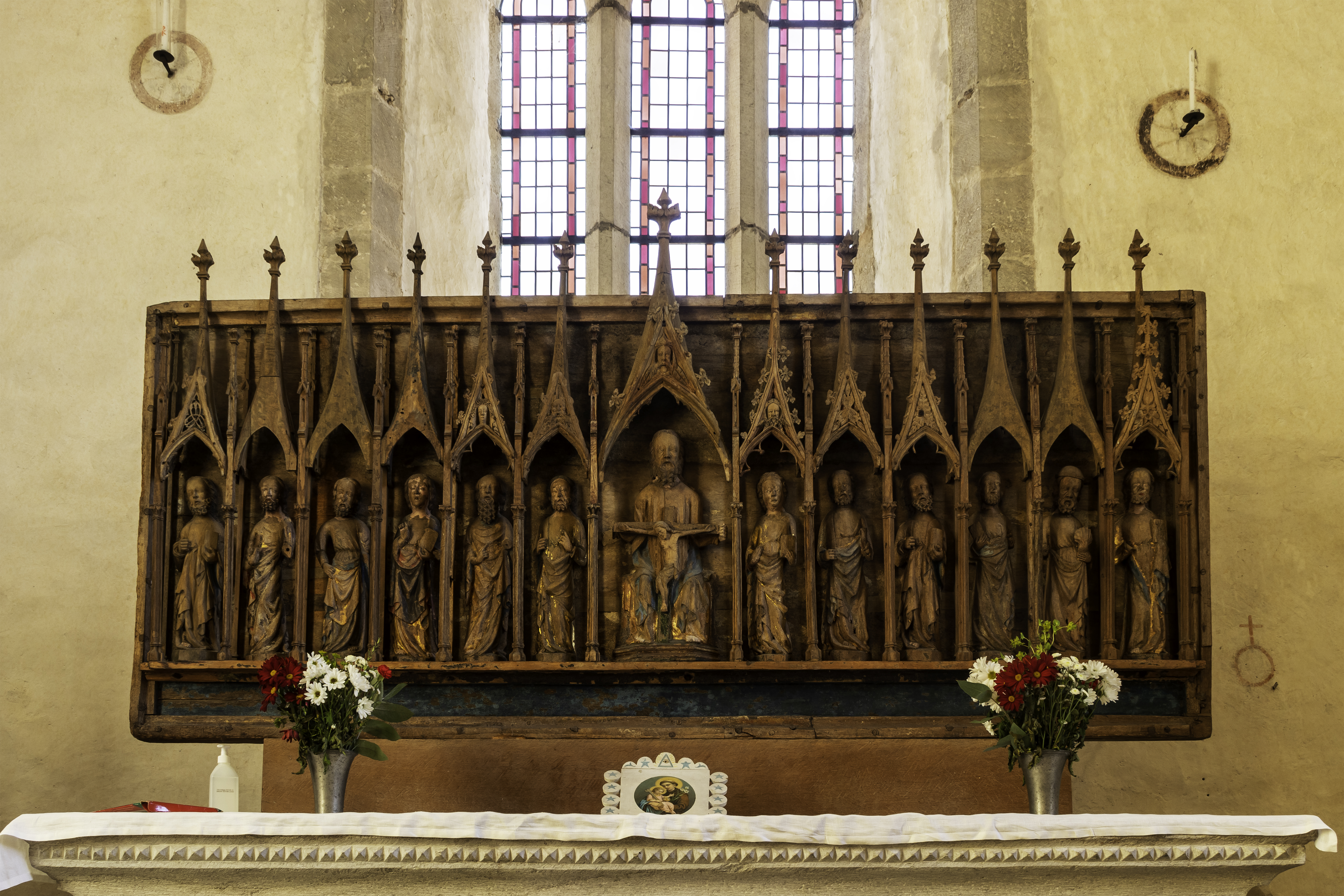

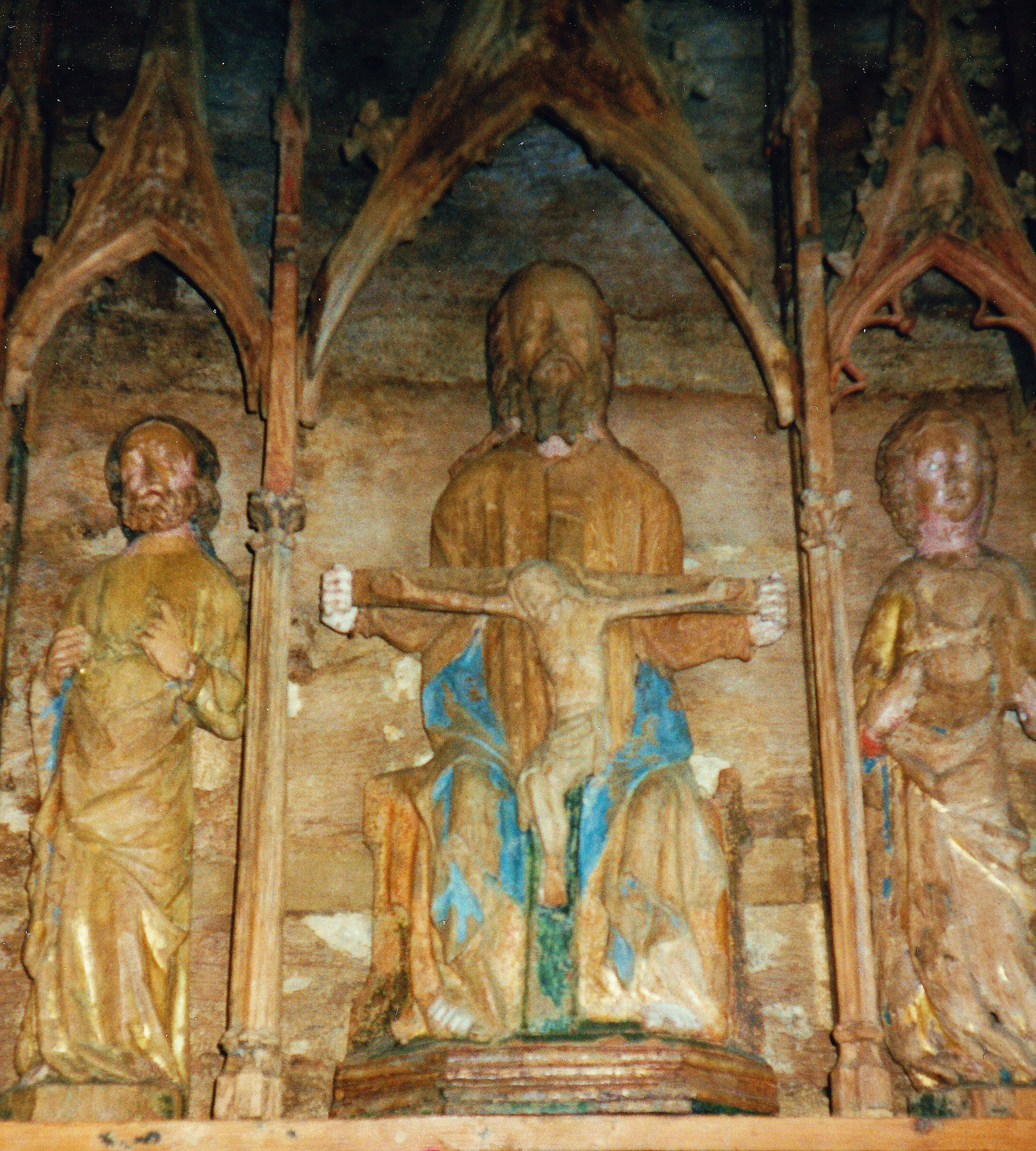

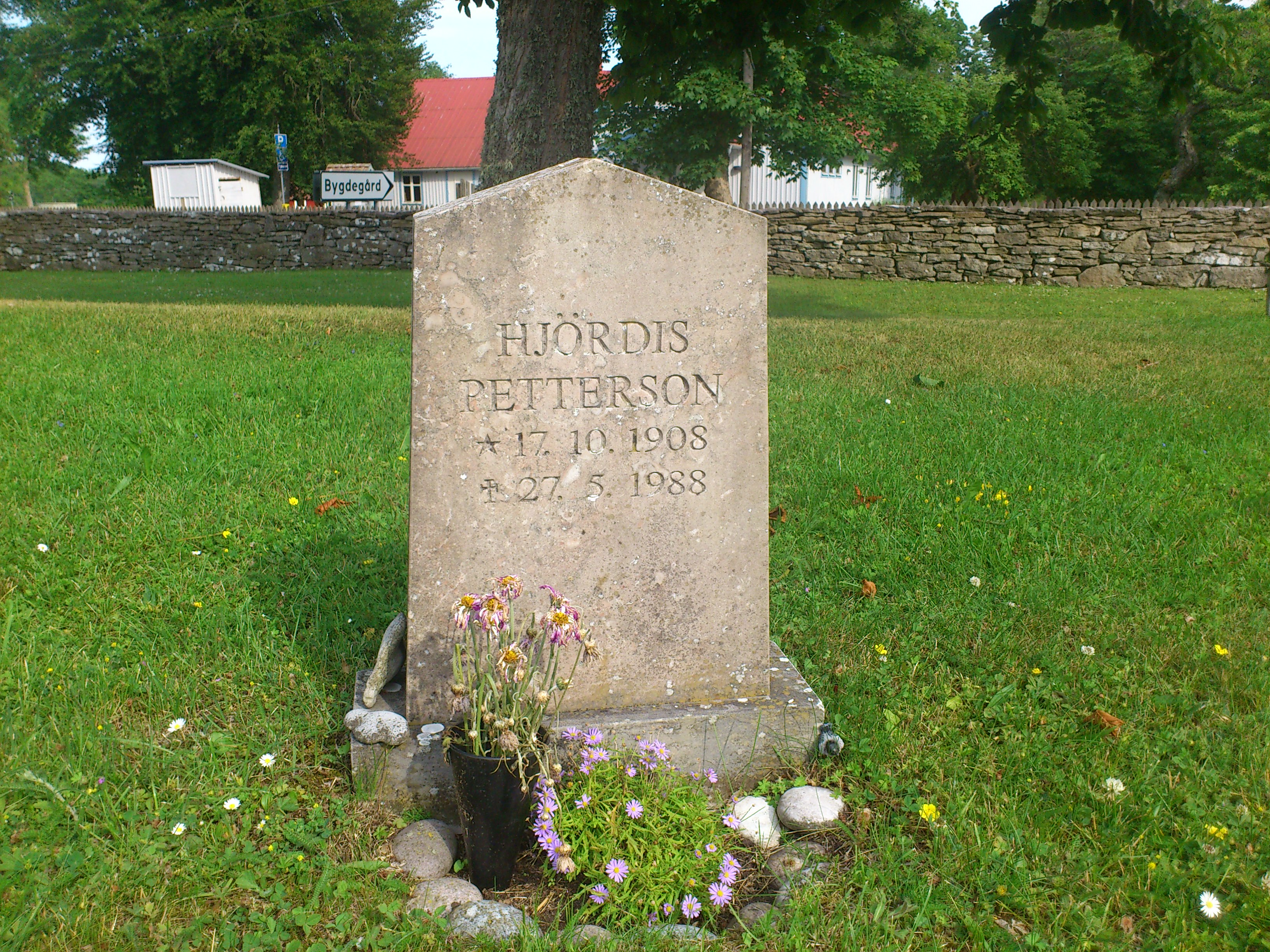
Actress Hjördis Petterson's grave.
