= Gnisvärd =

Gnisvärd Gnisvärd and Smågårde
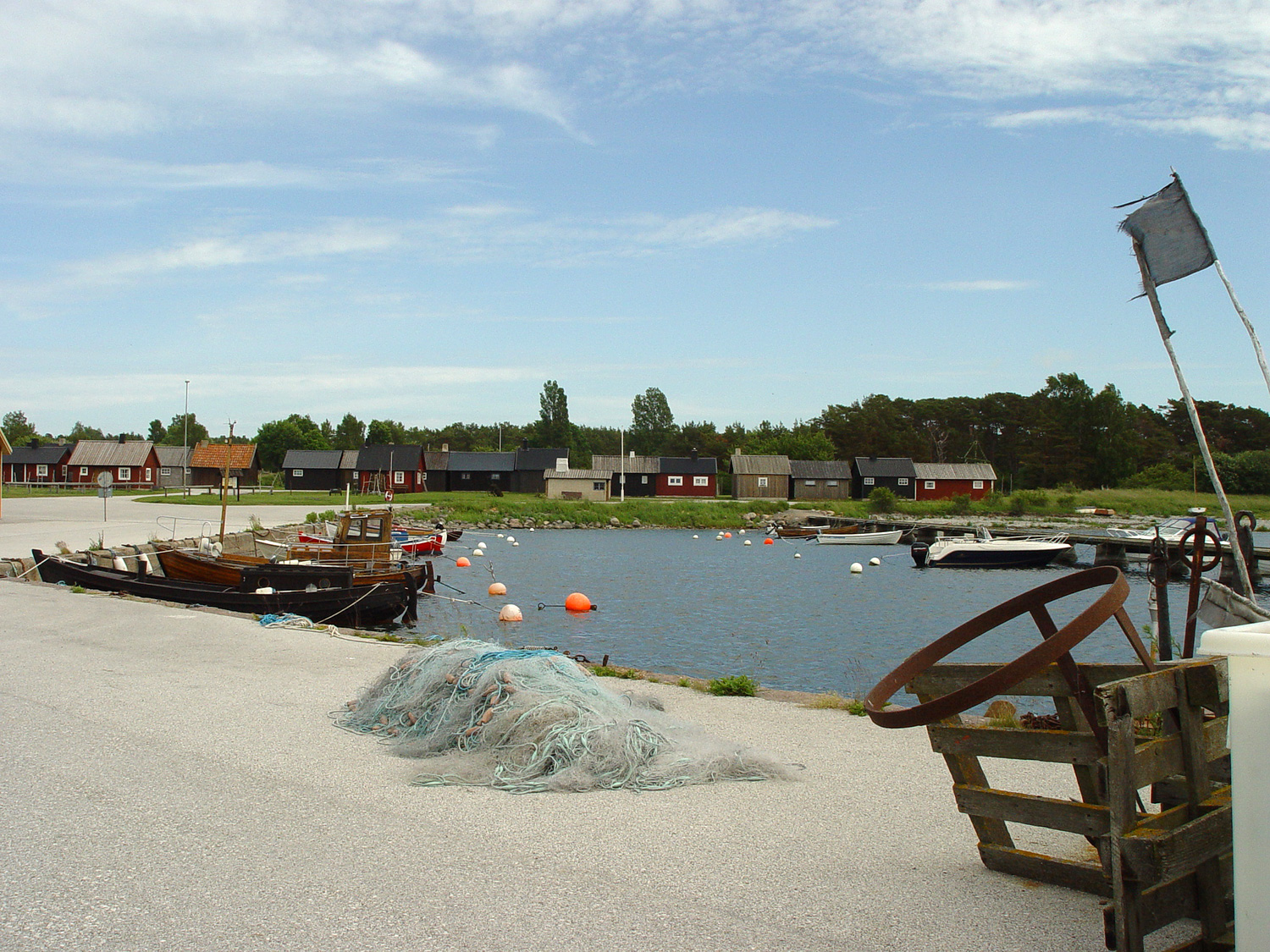
- Gnisvärd harbor

- Location within Gotland
- Coordinates: 57°30′26″N 18°06′44″E
- Country: Sweden
- Province: Gotland
- County: Gotland County
- Municipality: Gotland Municipality

Area
  - Total: 074 km^{2} (29 sq mi)

Population (2010)
  - Total: 125
- Time zone: UTC+1 (CET)
  - Summer (DST): UTC+2 (CEST)

Gnisvärd (also referred to as Gnisvärd and Smågårde), is a fishing village in Tofta on the central west coast of the island of Gotland, Sweden. Gnisvärd is mostly known for its stone ships and harbor.

== Geography ==
Gnisvärd is a small fishing village in the Tofta socken on the west coast of Gotland. It also includes the neighboring settlement Smågårde, about 1 km (0.62 mi) inland from Gnisvärd.

The natural harbor, south of the modern manmade, was originally sheltered by a reef. A manmade harbor with a breakwater was constructed in 1931. An extension of the harbor for pleasure craft was added later. North of the harbor is the 500 m (1,600 ft) long, sandy Gnisvärd beach.

As of 2019, Gnisvärd Chapel belongs to Eskelhem-Tofta parish in Eskelhems pastorat, along with the churches in Eskelhem and Tofta.

One of the asteroids in the main belt, 10814 Gnisvärd, is named after this place.

== History ==
Gnisvärd was first used as a harbor during the Viking Age. Along the north road to Gnisvärd are some of the best preserved Bronze Age stone ships on Gotland.

Formerly one of Gotland's biggest fishing villages, Gnisvärd is made up of about 40 cottages of limestone or wood, which line both sides of the narrow road running parallel to the beach. Most of the cottages were built during the 20th century. At the rear of the cottages are enclosed areas for drying fishing nets.

The importance of the village reached its height when herring fishing peaked: in 1600–1680, 1747–1809 and 1877–1906. The most renowned fishing was at the Laggrundet ("Lag shallow") at the end of the 19th century, where large quantities of fish spawned during April and May. Opportunities for cod and flounder fishing were also historically good in Gnisvärd.

The Gnisvärd Chapel, also known as the Strandkyrkan ("Beach Church"), was built in 1839 on the site of an earlier wooden chapel, probably dating from the 1600s.

=== Fälting-Lotte ===
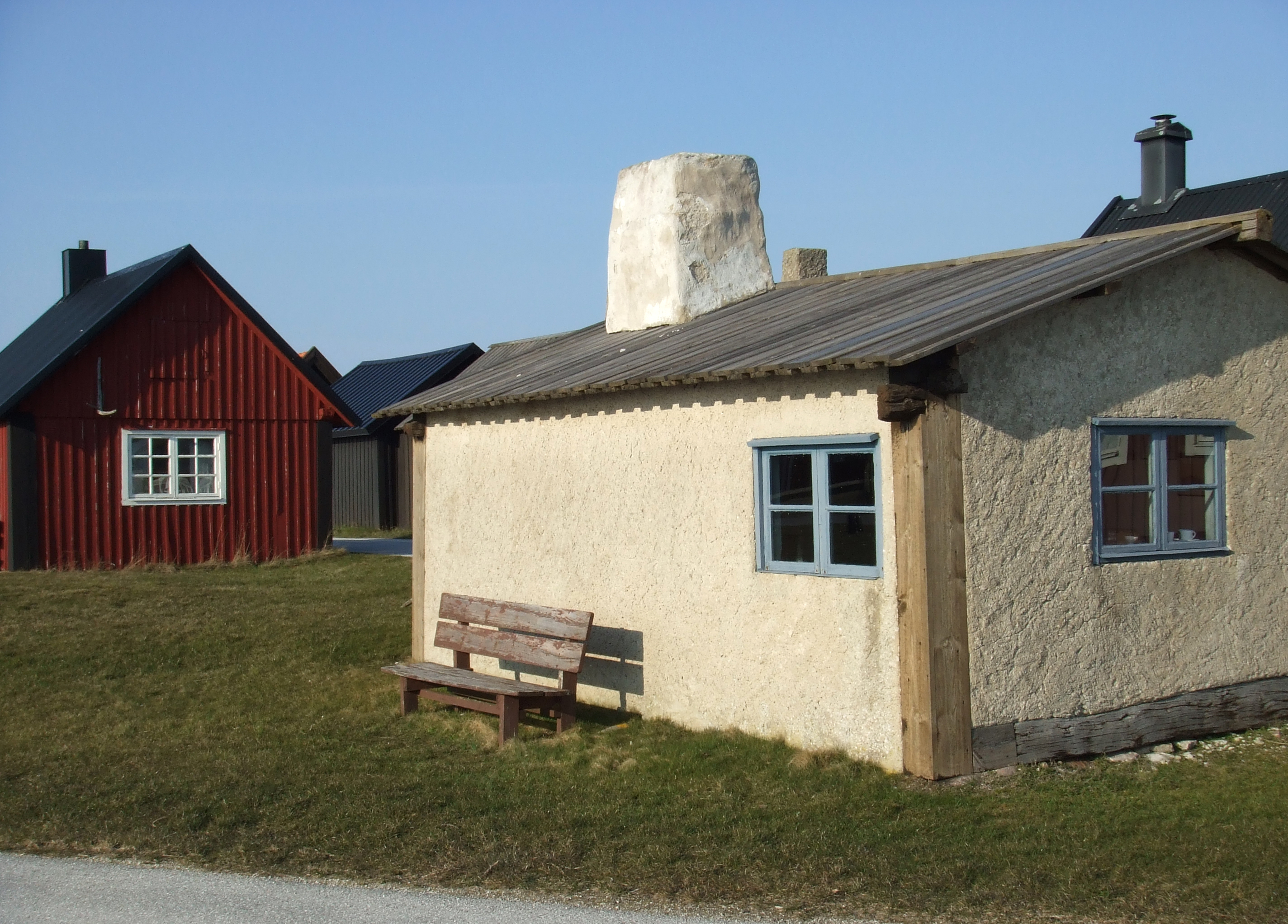
Fälting-Lotte's cottage at Gnisvärd harbor

One of the more noted persons from Gnisvärd was Anna Chartlotta Ganström (30 March 1837 – 14 September 1912), also known as Fälting-Lotte. The daughter of a boatswain, Fälting started out as a maid and later became one of Gotland's first female professional fishermen.

== Etymology ==
Gnisvärd is sometimes referred to as "Gnidsvärd", a combination of the Swedish gnid ("rub" or "wipe") and svärd ("sword"). The origin of this name is explained in old documents collected by the priest Hans Nielsön Strelow (1587 – 27 February 1656) and recorded in the 1633 chronicle Chronica Guthilandorum.

According to the text, Gotland suffered badly from sea-borne attacks by German pirates during the 17th century. The pirates also occupied the two islands of Stora Karlsö and Lilla Karlsö, southwest of Gnisvärd. The Gotlandic chieftains finally had enough and united in a counterattack on the pirates. Gierre from Sjonhem and Bogke, supplied his brother Hangvar with 18 manned ships, and made him commander of the campaign. They sailed from Bogeviken and attacked the pirates at the two islands where they killed them all and burned their 80 ships. When they returned to land after a successful campaign, they wiped their swords clean of the blood of their enemies in the white sand at "Gnidesuerdshaffn"—Gnidsvärd.

== Stone ships ==
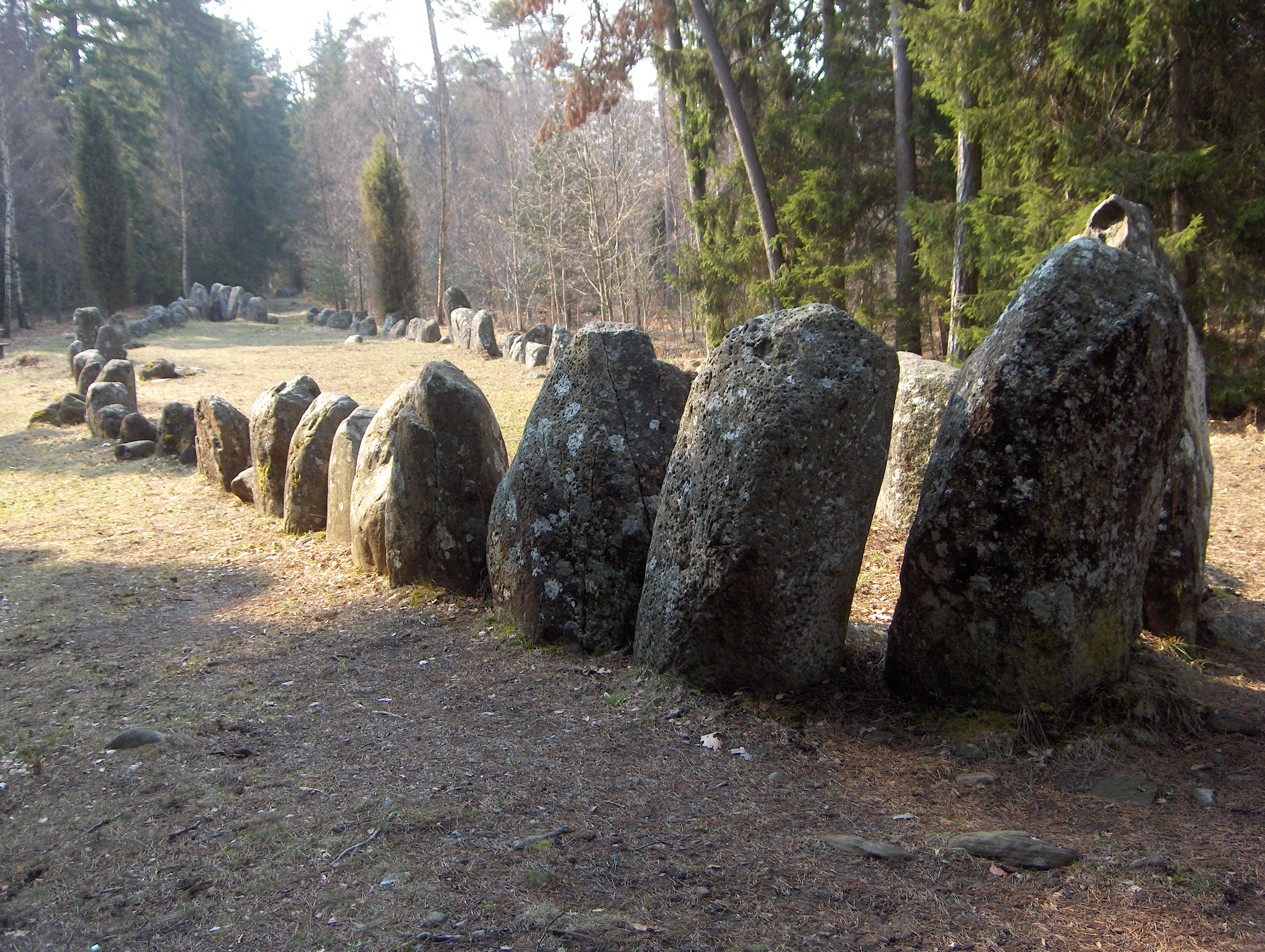
The largest of the stone ships in Gnisvärd

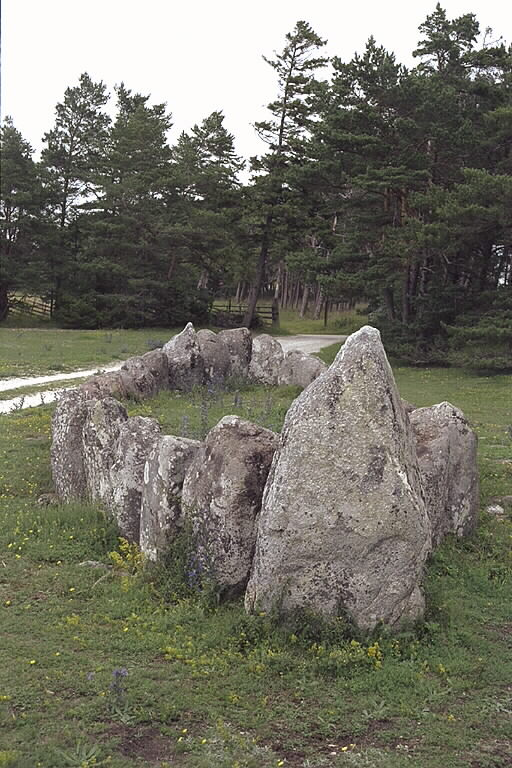
Gnisvärd stone ship. 2003 photo

The stone ships in Gnisvärd (the Gnisvärds skeppssättningar) date to the later Bronze Age and are some of the best preserved stone ships on the island. Located just south of the north road to the fishing village, one of them is the largest on Gotland, measuring 45 m (148 ft) in length and 7 m (23 ft) in breadth. Consisting of about 100 closely packed, erected stones, the bow and stern stones are the largest at approximately 1.3 m (4.3 ft). The stone ship is located between two smaller, round stone circles.

About 100 m (330 ft) south of the largest stone ship lies another, 36 m (118 ft) and 4 m (13 ft) wide, surrounded by two small stone circles, a stone tumulus 16 m (52 ft) in diameter and a smaller, slightly damaged stone ship. Approximately 200 m (660 ft) east of the first stone ship is a burial site consisting of one tumulus and eight round stone circles. There is also a large stone tumulus, 23 m (75 ft) in diameter and 2.7 m (8.9 ft) high, halfway between the stone ships and the fishing village.

North of the stone ships is the only megalithic tomb on Gotland dating to 3600–2900 BC. Excavations at the site have revealed the remains of several people from different time periods up until 85 AD, making it a collective grave that has been reused several times. The largest of the stone ships is positioned with its "prow" facing the tomb. Since the stone ship was constructed after the tomb, it has been suggested that this could have been done to "moor" the ship to an older and revered place.

=== False stone ship ===
Between the original stone ships and the beach is an enormous construction (57°30′26.5″N 18°07′33.0″E) that looks like a stone ship. However, this construction is not listed by the Swedish National Heritage Board.

== Gallery ==
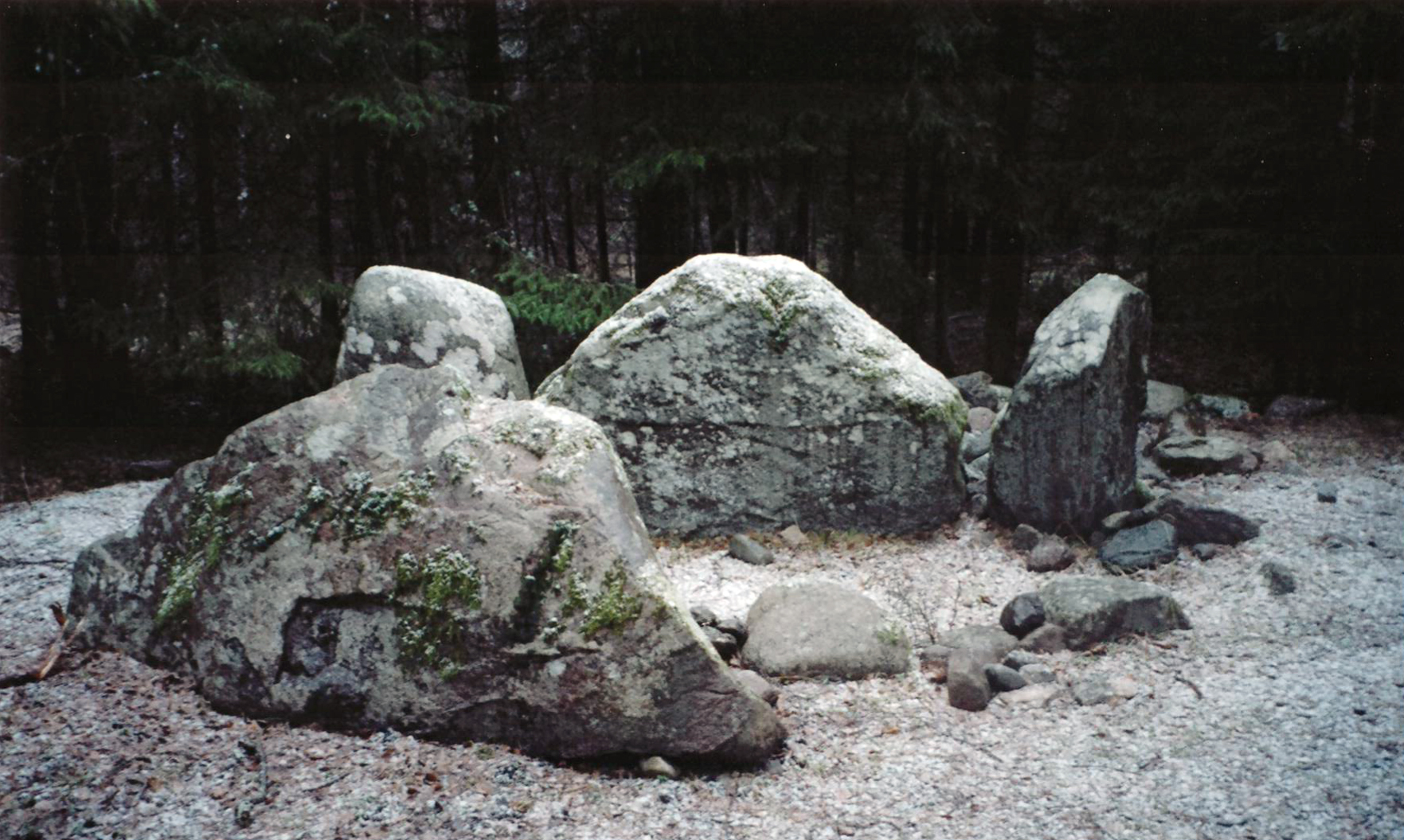
The megalith tomb in winter

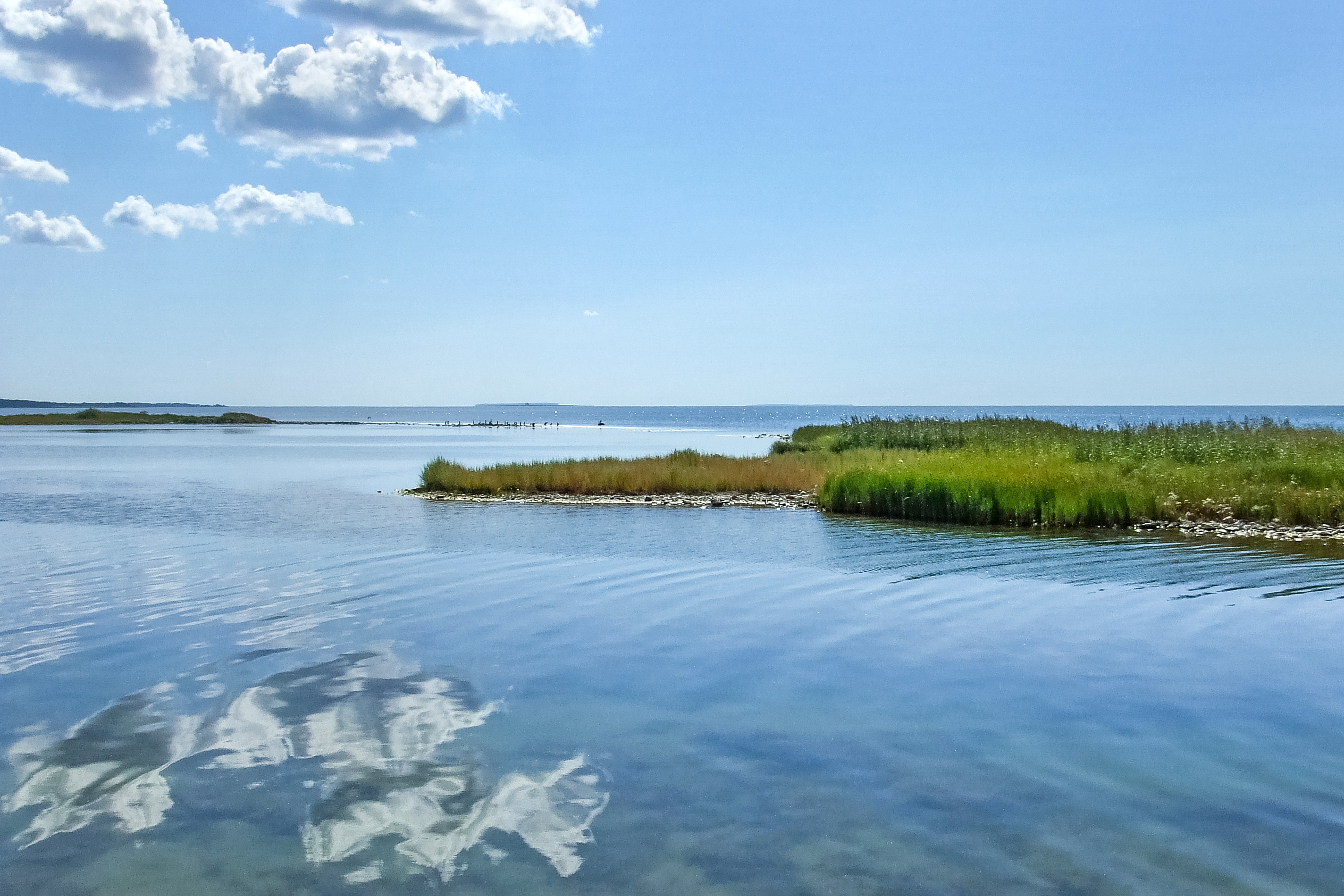
Part of the reef protecting the Viking Age harbor

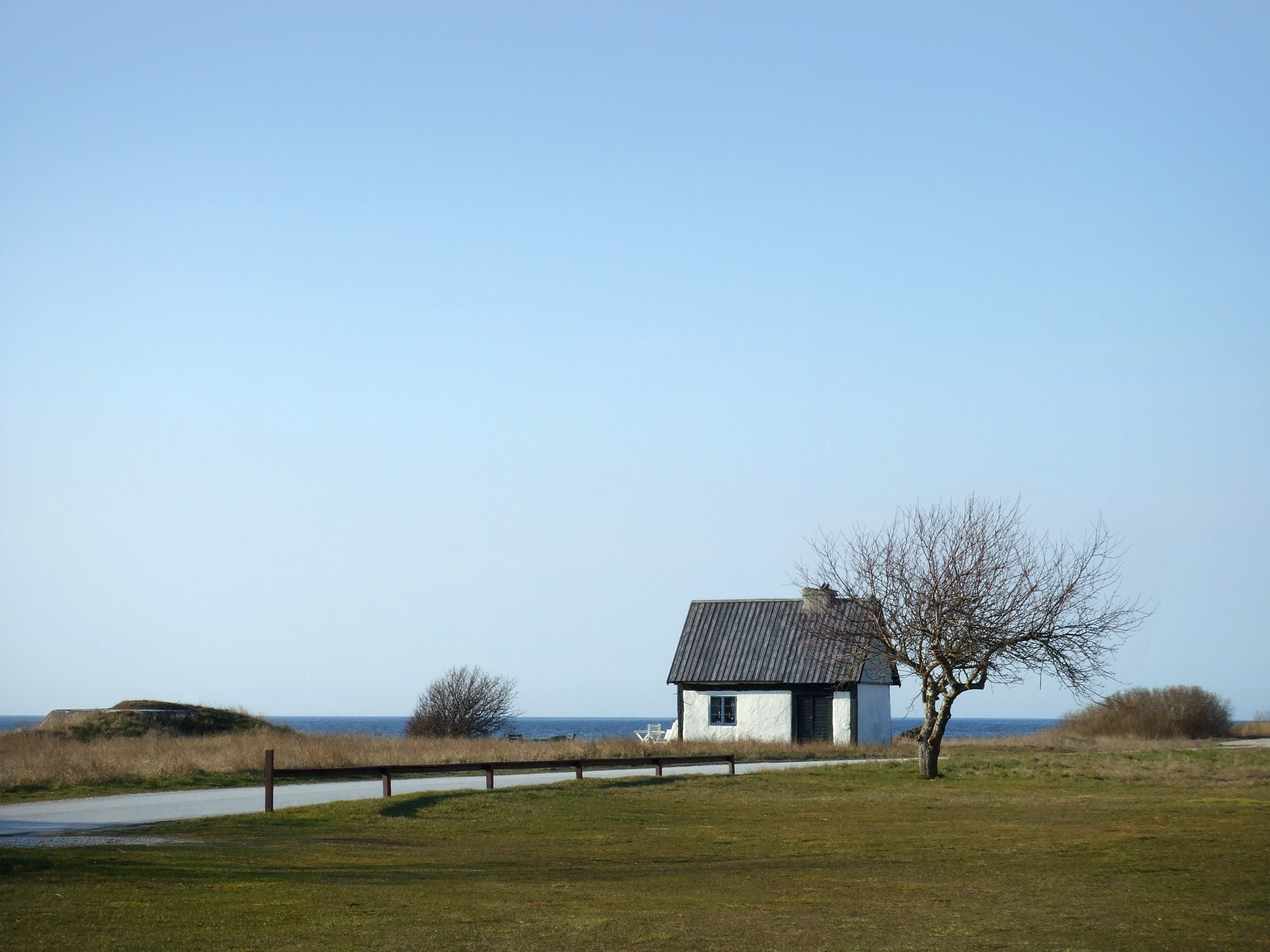
Cottage north of the fishing village

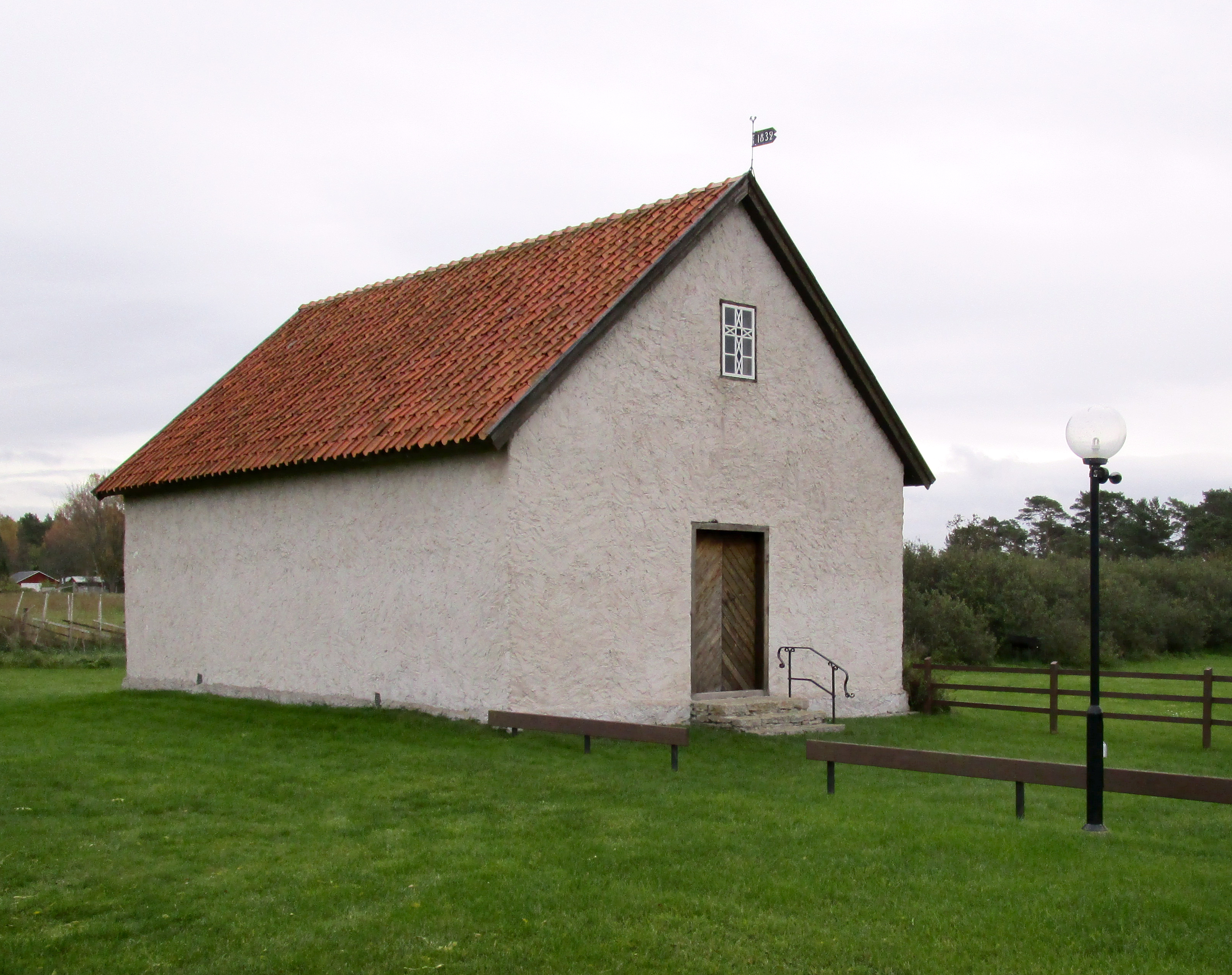
Gnisvärd Chapel

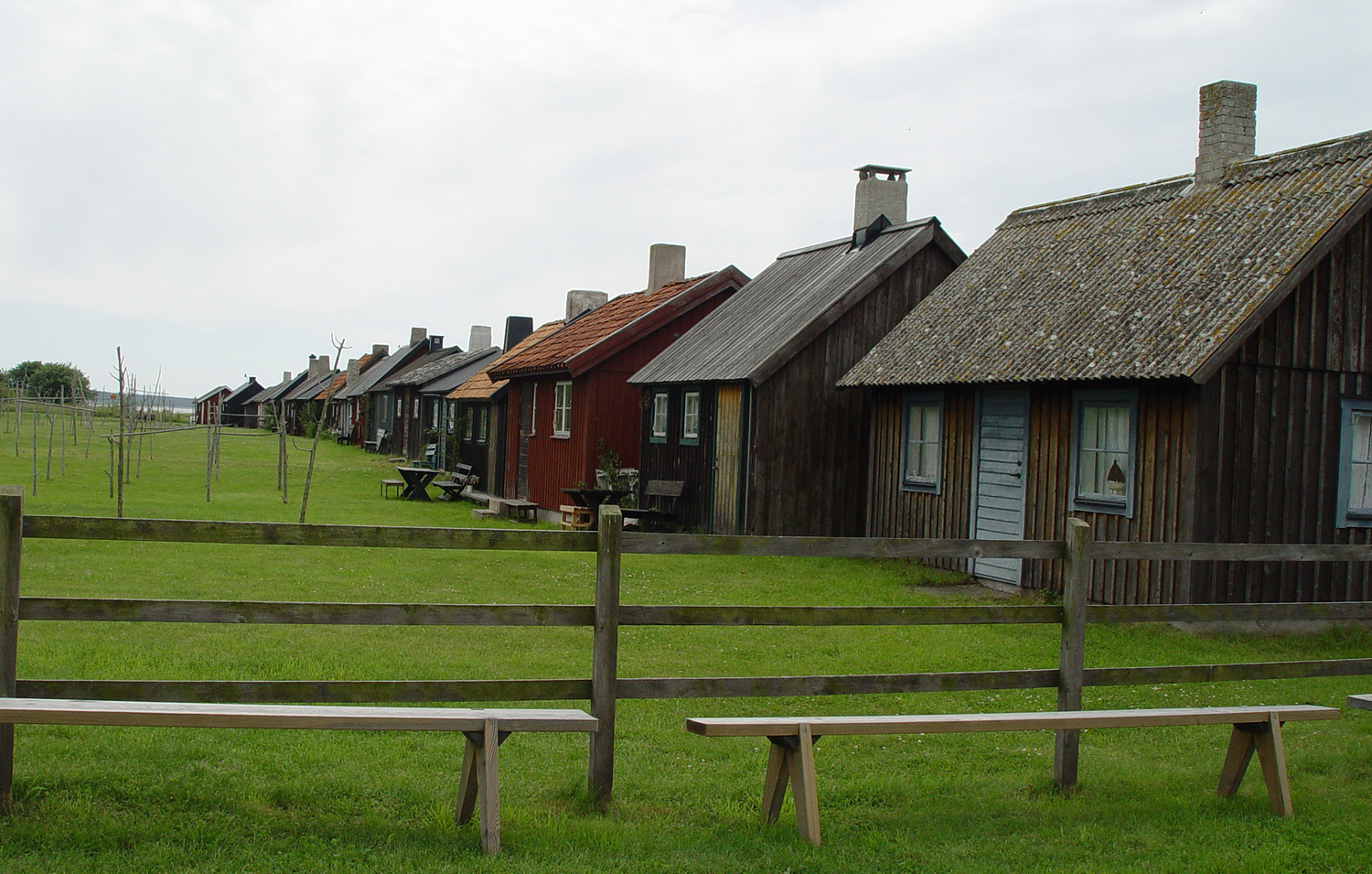
Area for drying nets behind one of the rows of cottages
