= Eskelhem Church =

- Eskelhems kyrka
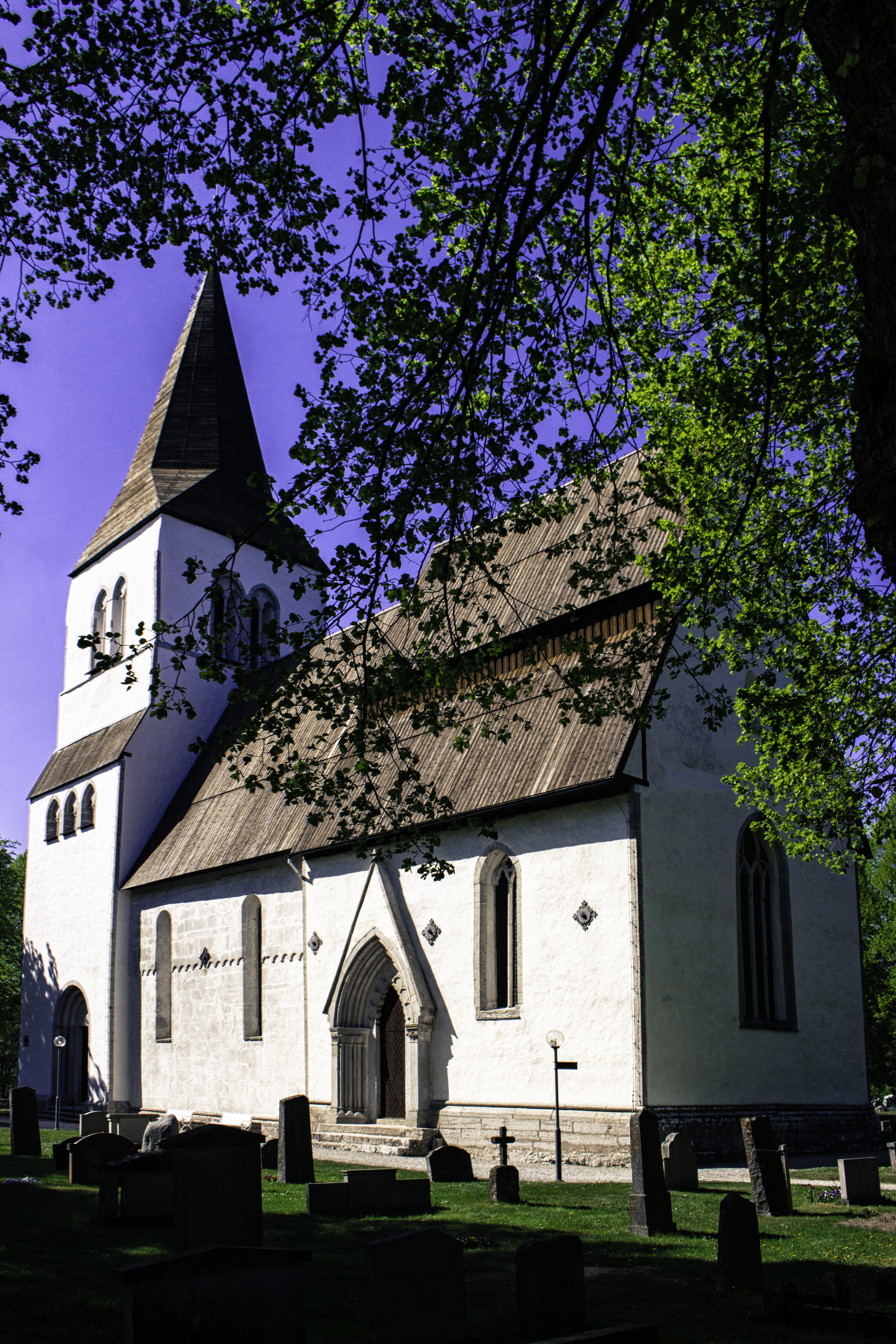
- Eskelhem Church, view of the exterior

- Location on Gotland
- 57°29′22″N 18°12′35″E
- Country: Sweden
- Denomination: Church of Sweden

Administration
- Diocese: Visby

Eskelhem Church (Swedish: Eskelhems kyrka) is a medieval church in Eskelhem on the Swedish island of Gotland, in the Diocese of Visby.

== History and architecture ==
Eskelhem Church was preceded by a wooden church, of which nothing remains. Circa 1200 it was replaced by a stone church. The walls of the nave of the present church are all that remains of this edifice. The church was successively enlarged and rebuilt until it received its present form in the middle of the 14th century. Internally, the church is decorated with different sets of murals, dating from the end of the 13th century and the 15th, the latter by the Master of the Passion of Christ. Among the church furnishings, the baptismal font from the 12th century, probably made by the artist or workshop today referred to as Byzantios, and the triumphal cross, made around 1250 both deserve mention.
