= Body of Christ Church =

Church in Visby, Sweden

- Kristi Lekamens kyrka
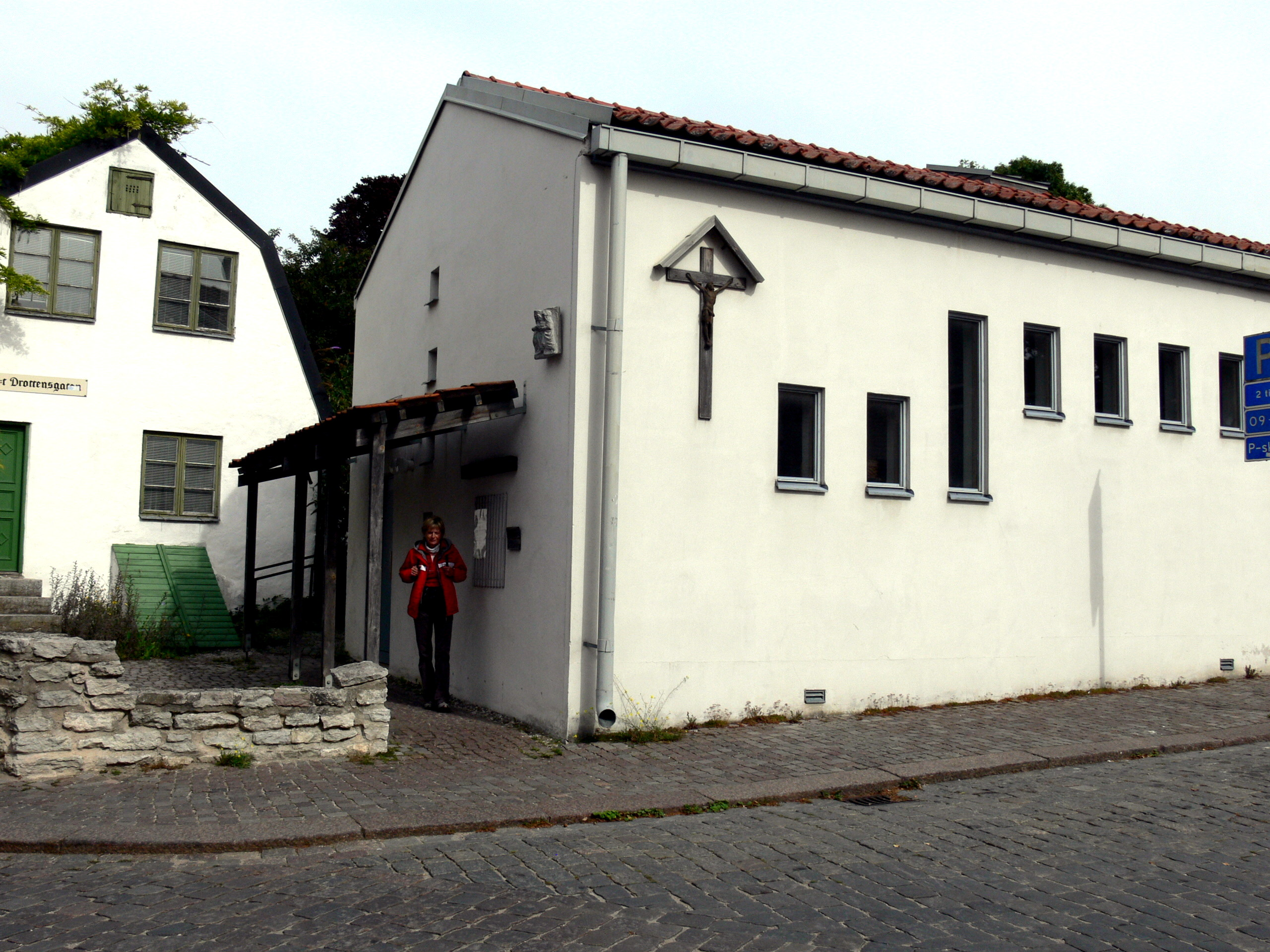
- Body of Christ Church

- Location within Gotland
- 57°38′31″N 18°17′43″E
- Country: Sweden
- Denomination: Catholic Church

The Body of Christ Church (Swedish: Kristi Lekamens kyrka is a Roman Catholic church in Visby on the Swedish island of Gotland. Inaugurated by Bishop Hubertus Brandenburg in 1982, it is the first Catholic church to be built on Gotland since the Middle Ages. The relatively small church has space for around 80 worshippers at a time.
