= Vårdklockan Church =

Church in Visby, Sweden

- Vårdklockans kyrka
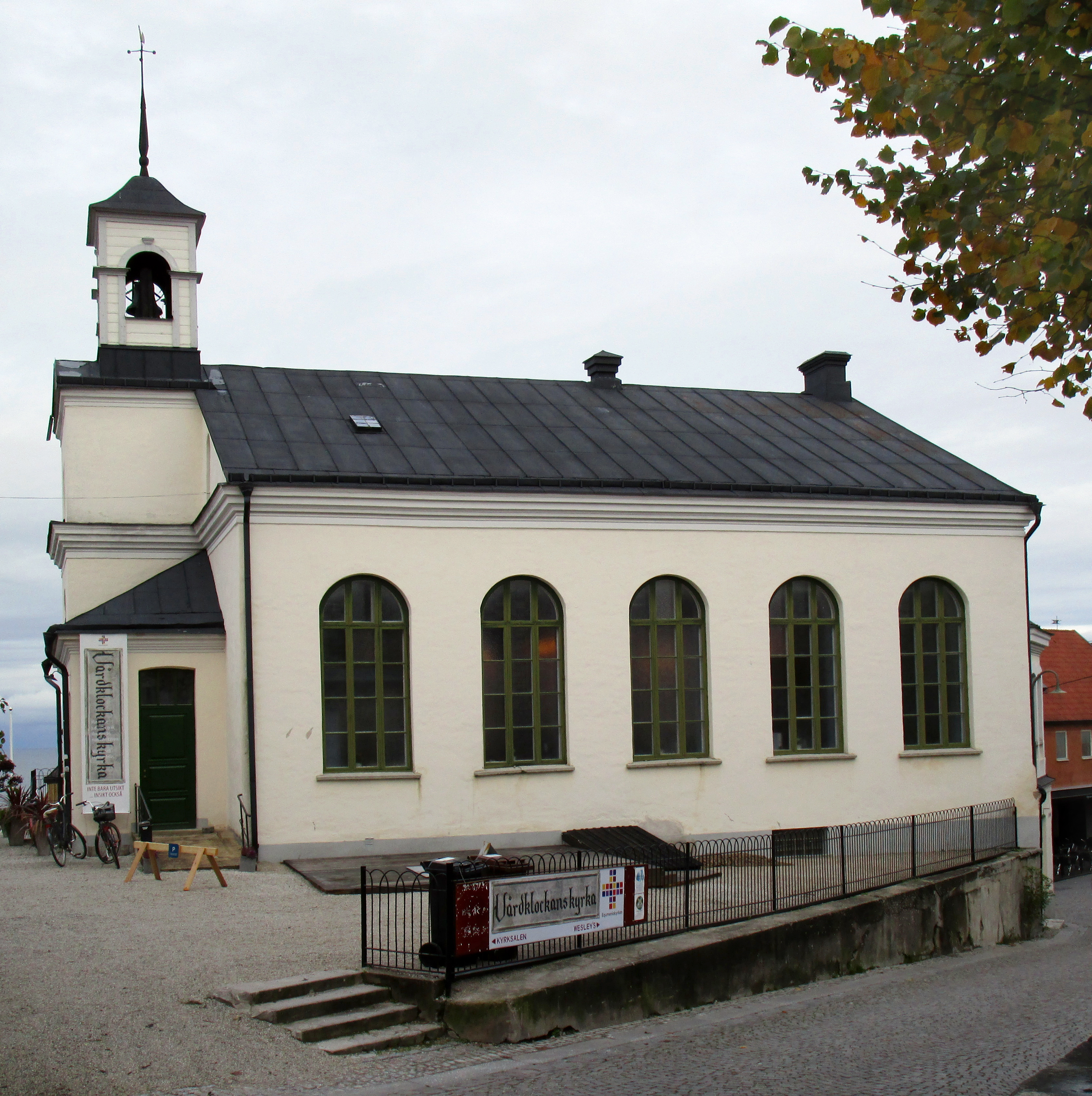
- Vårdklockan Church

- Location within Gotland
- 57°38′18″N 18°17′44″E
- Country: Sweden
- Denomination: Uniting Church in Sweden

Vårdklockan Church is a church in Visby, on the island of Gotland in Sweden. It belongs to the Protestant Uniting Church in Sweden.
