= Terra Nova Church =

- Terra Nova kyrkan
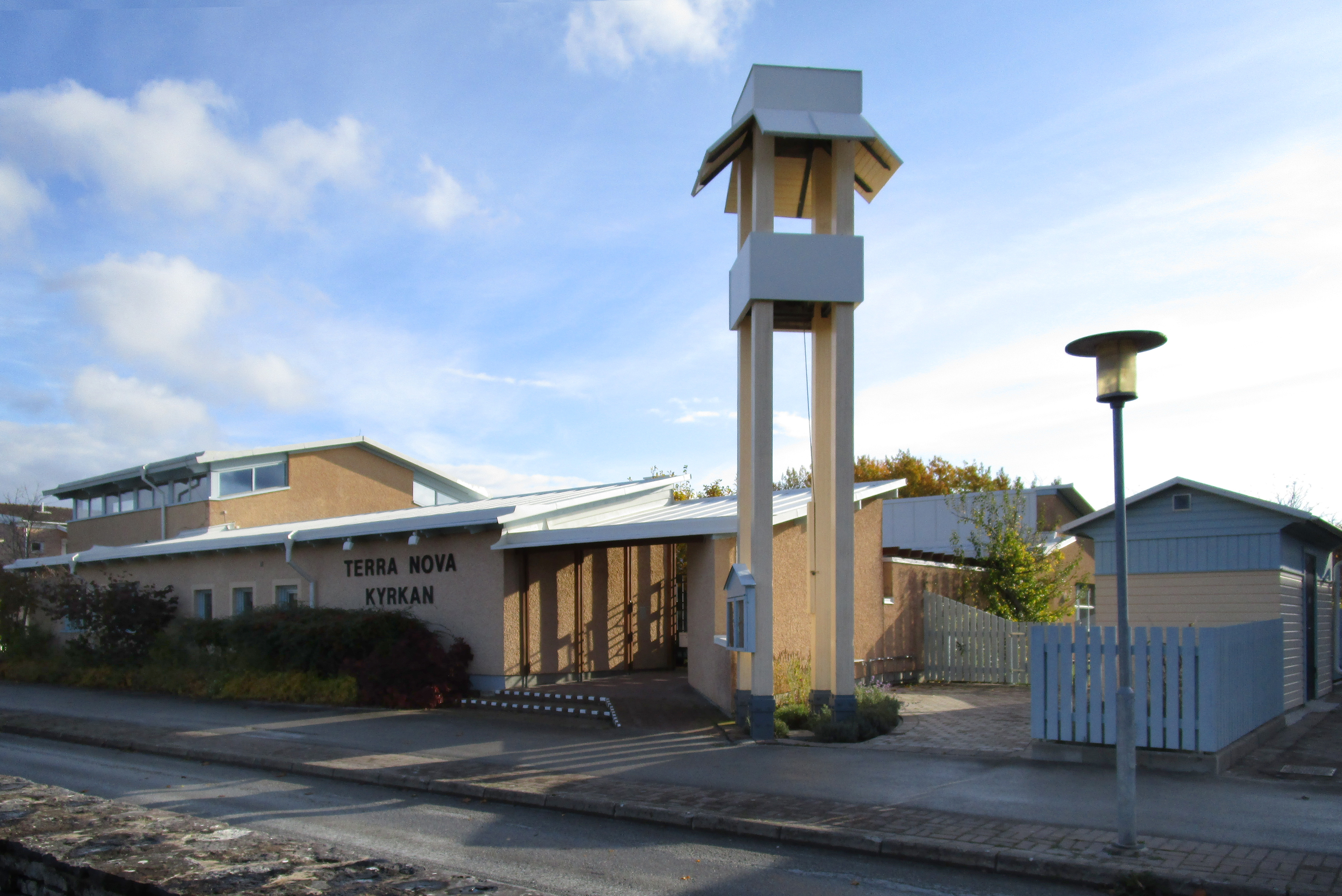
- Terra Nova Church

- Location within Gotland
- title 57°36′48.26″N 18°18′41.47″E
- Country: Sweden
- Denomination: Church of Sweden

Terra Nova Church Swedish: Terra Nova kyrkan is a church in Visby, on the Swedish island Gotland. The church was designed by Hans Wieland and was inaugurated in 1983. It was inaugurated by Bishop Tore Furberg.
