= Visborg Church =

- Visborgskyrkan
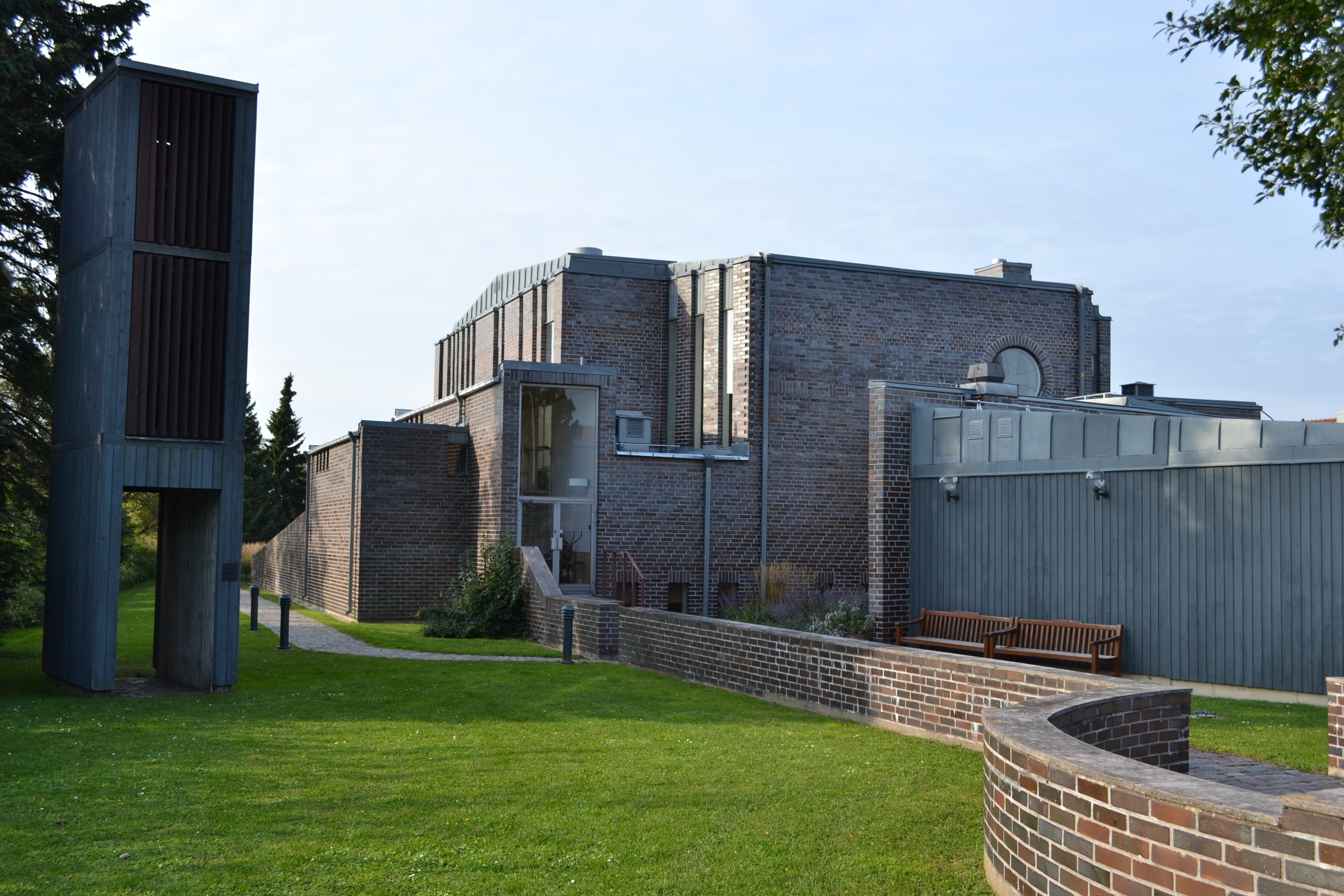
- Visborg Church

- Location within Gotland
- 57°37′28″N 18°17′06″E
- Country: Sweden
- Denomination: Church of Sweden

Administration
- Diocese: Visby

Visborg Church is a church in Visby, on the island of Gotland in Sweden.

The church was built in 1969 and designed by architect Per Erik Nilsson. It's built of brick and pine wood. The decorative glass in the church is made by artist Jan Wichelgren, while Christine Wichelgren has made the textiles.
