= Hejdeby =

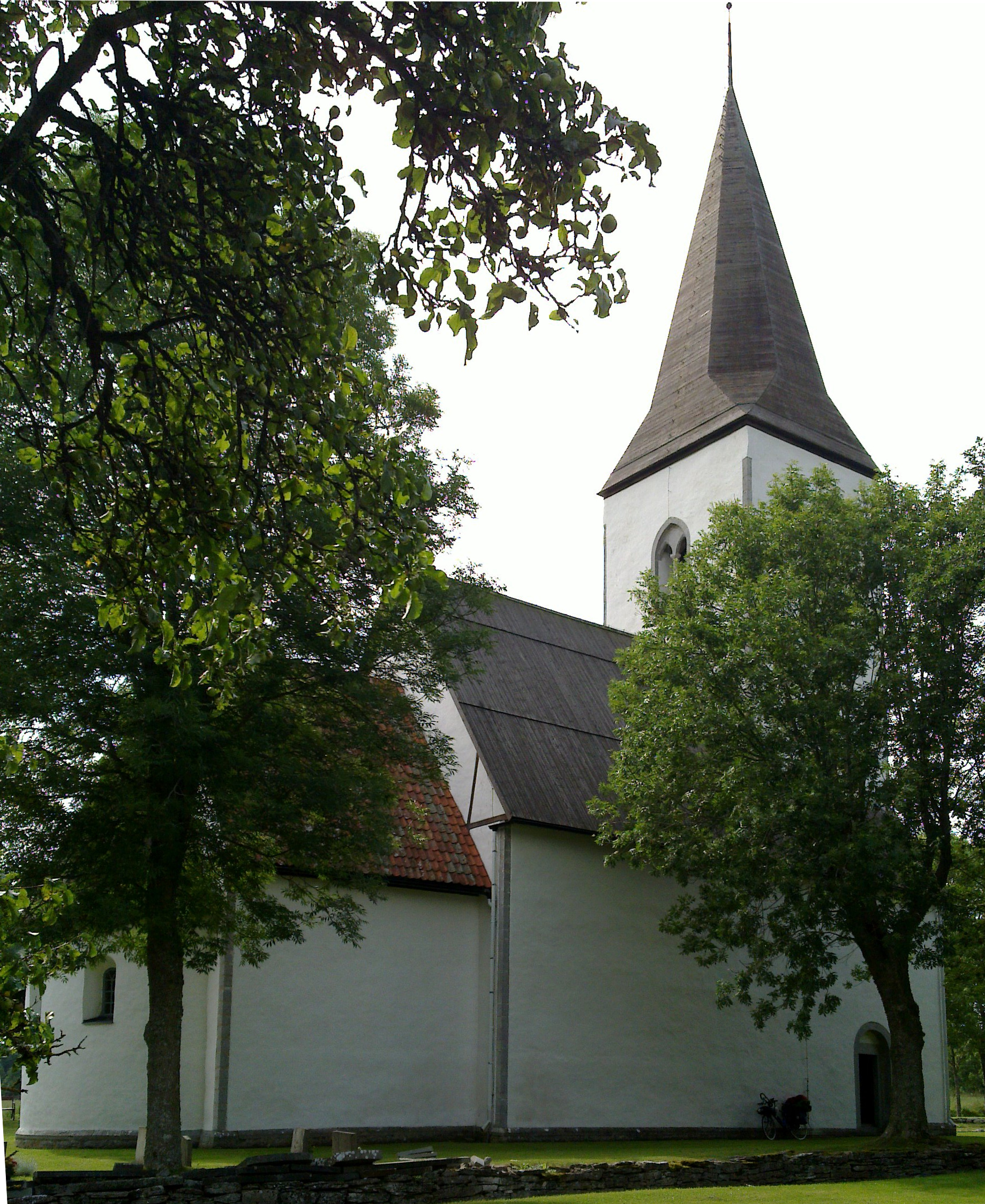
- Hejdeby Church

- Location within Gotland
- Coordinates: 57°37′49″N 18°26′33″E
- Country: Sweden
- Province: Gotland
- County: Gotland County
- Municipality: Gotland Municipality

Area
  - Total: 22.02 km^{2} (8.50 sq mi)

Population (2014)
  - Total: 153
- Time zone: UTC+1 (CET)
  - Summer (DST): UTC+2 (CEST)

Hejdeby is a populated area, a socken (not to be confused with parish), on the Swedish island of Gotland. It comprises the same area as the administrative Hejdeby District, established on 1 January 2016.

== Geography ==
Hejdeby is situated in the northwest part of Gotland, just east of Visby. The medieval Hejdeby Church is located in the socken. As of 2019, Hejdeby Church belongs to Hejdeby parish in Romaklosters pastorat.
