= Klinte Church =

- Klinte kyrka
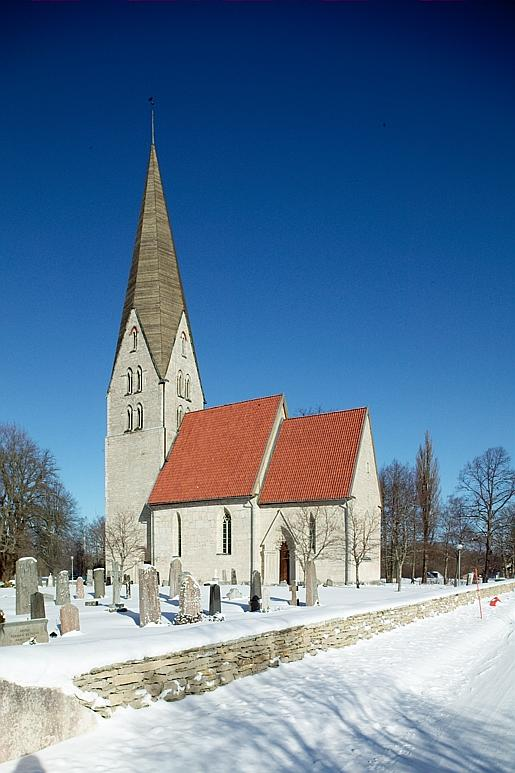
- Klinte Church, view of the exterior

- Location on Gotland
- 57°22′42″N 18°13′56″E
- Country: Sweden
- Denomination: Church of Sweden

Administration
- Diocese: Visby

Klinte Church (Swedish: Klinte kyrka) is a medieval church in Klinte on the Swedish island of Gotland, not far from Klintehamn. Finished around the 1300, it is a largely Gothic church. It is part of the Diocese of Visby.

== History and architecture ==
The oldest part of Klinte Church is the base of the tower, which is from the first half of the 13th century and built in a decidedly Romanesque style. It is the only remaining part of an earlier, Romanesque church. Around the year 1300, the choir and nave of this church was replaced by the presently visible, Gothic choir and nave. During this time the upper part of the tower was also added.

Externally, the base of the tower has a Romanesque portal and windows. The upper part of the tower displays Gothic windows. The choir portal is furthermore noteworthy due to its capitals, an accomplished example of stone sculpture from the time.

Internally, the choir vault is decorated with murals similar to those in Rone Church. In the eastern window of the choir, some original stained glass window panes survive, depicting religious scenes. They have been assumed to have been made by the same artisan who made the stained glass windows of Alskog Church. Among the church furnishings, the triumphal cross is medieval, dating from the 15th century. The sandstone altarpiece bears the date 1643, and was carved by the sculptor Gert van Eghen. The baptismal font is from 1667, and the pews also largely date from the 17th century.

A renovation of the church was carried out in 1933.
