= Snoderån =

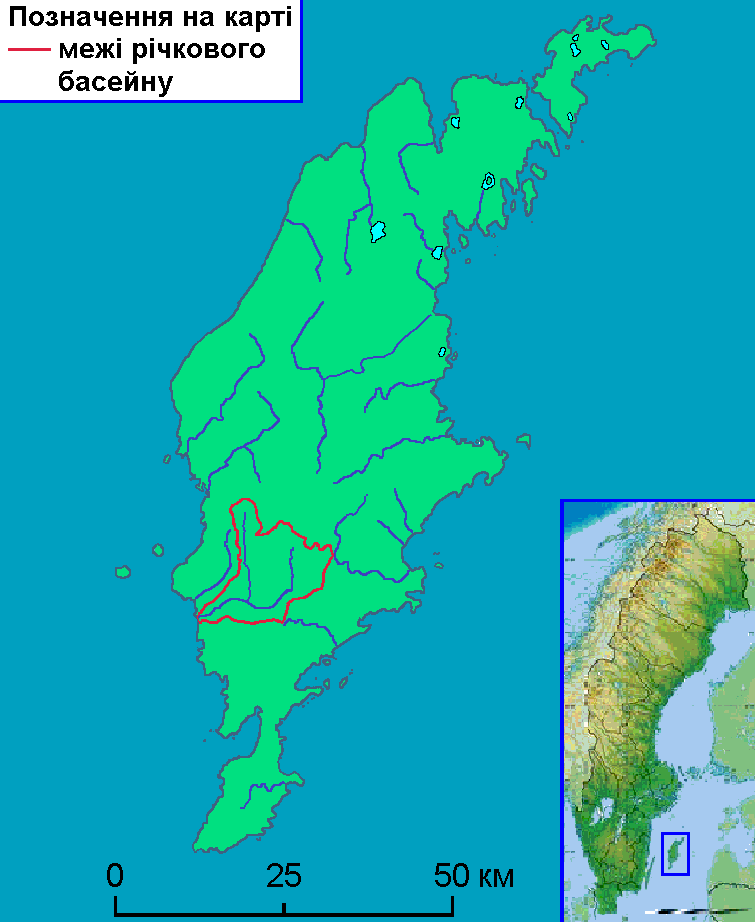
- Map of the river Snoderån

Location
- Country: Sweden
- County: Gotland
- Municipality: Gotland

Physical characteristics
- Length: 32 km (20 mi)
- Basin size: 183.3 km^{2} (70.8 sq mi)

Snoderån is a 32 km (20 mi) long river on Gotland, Sweden. Snoderån basin has an area of 183.3 km^{2} (70.8 sq mi) and it has a total area of 240 km^{2} (93 sq mi), which represents about 8% of Gotland's area. 17 socken's are situated wholly or partly within the basin and comprises (exclusive enclaves) of: Alva, Burs, Fardhem, Fröjel, Gerum, Hablingbo, Havdhem, Hejde, Hemse, Klinte, Levide, Linde, Lojsta, Rone, Silte, Sproge and Stånga. Snoderån has its source in the Lojsta area and two outflows to the west into the Baltic Sea at Kvarnåkershamn in Sproge and Silte.
