= List of shipwrecks in November 1848 =

The list of shipwrecks in November 1848 includes ships sunk, foundered, wrecked, grounded, or otherwise lost during November 1848.

== 1 November ==
List of shipwrecks: 1 November 1848
Ship	State	Description
Canton	United Kingdom	The ship was wrecked on the East Key, in the Dry Tortugas. She was on a voyage from New Orleans, Louisiana, United States to Liverpool, Lancashire.
Elizabeth	United Kingdom	The ship sank off Worms Head, Glamorgan. She was on a voyage from Pembrey, Pembrokeshire to Newport, Monmouthshire. She was refloated on 11 November and taken in to Swansea, Glamorgan.
Ellen	(United Kingdom of Great Britain and Ireland) British North America	The ship was driven ashore crewless at Wellington, Nova Scotia, where she was wrecked.

== 2 November ==
List of shipwrecks: 2 November 1848
Ship	State	Description
Eliza	United Kingdom	The ship was driven ashore at Ness Point, Suffolk. She was refloated and taken in to Lowestoft.
Fortuna	Hamburg	The ship was driven ashore at Dungeness, Kent, United Kingdom. Her crew were rescued. She was on a voyage from Porto Alegre, Brazil to Hamburg. She was refloated on 10 November and take in to Rye, Sussex, United Kingdom.
Funchal	Portugal	The ship was lost near Bay Bulls, Newfoundland, British North America. She was on a voyage from Porto to Saint John's, Newfoundland
Hotspur	United Kingdom	The brig ran aground on the Goodwin Sands, Kent. She was on a voyage from South Shields, County Durham to Limerick. She was refloated and resumed her voyage.
Isabella	United Kingdom	The ship ran aground at South Shields, County Durham. She was on a voyage from Ancona, Papal States to South Shields. She was refloated the next day and taken in to South Shields.
Jane	United Kingdom	The schooner was wrecked on Stroma with the loss of three of her four crew. She was on a voyage from Belfast, County Antrim to Wick, Caithness.
Jessie	(United Kingdom of Great Britain and Ireland) Guernsey	The schooner ran aground on Neckman's Ground, in the Baltic Sea. She was on a voyage from Málaga, Spain to Kronstadt, Russia. She was refloated and resumed her voyage, but was consequently beached on Hogland on 6 November. Two of her eight crew died before they could be rescued by the schooner Caroline ( Stettin ) on 8 November.
Mersey	United Kingdom	The ship was driven ashore at Heisernest, Prussia. She was on a voyage from Danzig to Belfast, County Antrim. She was refloated and resumed her voyage.
Warrior	United Kingdom	The brig ran aground on the Goodwin Sands. She was on a voyage from Hull, Yorkshire to Limerick. She was refloated and resumed her voyage.

== 3 November ==
List of shipwrecks: 3 November 1848
Ship	State	Description
Deux Petits Cousins	France	The ship was wrecked on the Barge, off Sables d'Olonne, Vendée.
Elizabeth	United Kingdom	The ship was driven ashore at Robin Hoods Bay, Yorkshire. She had become a wreck by 16 November.
George	France	The ship was driven ashore at Hartlepool, County Durham, United Kingdom.
Harmony	United Kingdom	The ship was driven ashore at Hartlepool.
Hero	United Kingdom	The ship ran aground on the Herd Sand, in the North Sea off the coast of County Durham. Her crew were rescued. She was on a voyage from Hamburg to South Shields, County Durham.
Lady Louisa Kerr	United Kingdom	The ship was driven ashore in Glenarm Bay. Her crew were rescued. She was on a voyage from Maryport, Cumberland to Glenarm, County Antrim. She was refloated on 10 November.
Margaretha	Kingdom of Hanover	The ship was driven ashore and wrecked on Juist. She was on a voyage from Steinhausersiel to Port Dundas, Renfrewshire, United Kingdom.
New Speedwell	United Kingdom	The ship was driven ashore and wrecked at Robin Hoods Bay, Yorkshire.
Sarah and Isabella	United Kingdom	The ship was driven ashore near Sandsend, North Riding of Yorkshire. She was on a voyage from Whitby to Newcastle upon Tyne, Northumberland.

== 4 November ==
List of shipwrecks: 4 November 1848
Ship	State	Description
Atrochia	(United Kingdom of Great Britain and Ireland) Jersey	The ship ran aground off Norden, Kingdom of Hanover. She was on a voyage from Jersey to Norden. Also reported as happening at South Shields, County Durham.
Emma	United Kingdom	The ship ran aground on the Cormar Rocks. She was on a voyage from Königsberg, Prussia to London. She was refloated and put in to Great Yarmouth, Norfolk in a leaky condition.
John	United Kingdom	The ship was driven ashore at Saltfleet, Lincolnshire. Her crew were rescued. She was on a voyage from Boston, Lincolnshire to Goole, Yorkshire.
Mère de la Garde	France	The ship was lost near Aigues-Mortes, Gard.
Meta	United Kingdom	The ship was driven ashore and wrecked at North Somercotes, Lincolnshire. Her crew were rescued. She was on a voyage from Boston, Lincolnshire to Newcastle upon Tyne, Northumberland.
Nymph	(United Kingdom of Great Britain and Ireland) British North America	The ship was wrecked at Country Harbour, Nova Scotia and was abandoned by her crew. She subsequently floated off and drifted out to sea.
Pera	United Kingdom	The ship was wrecked on the Salthouse Bank, in the Irish Sea off the coast of Lancashire. Her crew were rescued. She was on a voyage from Dundalk, County Louth to Preston, Lancashire.
St. Justin	France	The ship was lost near Aigues-Mortes.
Suffolk	United Kingdom	The ship was in collision with the brig Beacon in the North Sea off the Dudgeon Lightship ( Trinity House) and was abandoned by her crew, who were rescued by Beacon. Suffolk was on a voyage from Southwold, Suffolk to Aberdeen. She was subsequently taken in to Great Yarmouth, Norfolk.
Tennessee	United States	The ship ran aground off Dunkirk, Nord, France. She was on a voyage from Laguna Comarca, Mexico to Hamburg. She was refloated on 30 November and taken in to Dunkirk, where she was condemned.
Thwaites	United Kingdom	The ship was in collision with Shamrock (United Kingdom) and foundered in the English Channel off Dungeness, Kent. Her crew were rescued. She was on a voyage from South Shields, County Durham to Hastings, Sussex.
Venus	United Kingdom	The ship departed from Limerick for Bristol, Gloucestershire. No further trace, presumed foundered with the loss of all hands.
Williams	United Kingdom	The ship sprang a leak and sank in the North Sea off the coast of Lincolnshire. Her crew were rescued. She was on a voyage from Sutton Bridge, Lincolnshire to Goole, Yorkshire.

== 5 November ==
List of shipwrecks: 5 November 1848
Ship	State	Description
Aimwell	United Kingdom	The sloop foundered in the North Sea off Weybourne, Norfolk wtth the loss of all hands.
Alert	United Kingdom	The schooner was lost near Goeree, Zeeland, Netherlands with the loss of a crew member.
Brisloff	Russia	The full-rigged ship was driven ashore and wrecked in the Dardanelles. She was on a voyage from Newcastle upon Tyne, Northumberland, United Kingdom to Odesa.
Chèrie	France	The ship was in collision with Emma (United Kingdom) off the Goodwin Sands, Kent, United Kingdom and was severely damaged. She was on a voyage from Blyth, Northumberland to Rouen, Seine-Inférieure. She put in to Boulogne, Pas-de-Calais in a sinking condition.
Clio	United Kingdom	The brig was driven ashore at Worthing, Sussex. She was on a voyage from Newcastle upon Tyne to a Mediterranean port. She was refloated.
Elizabeth	(United Kingdom of Great Britain and Ireland) Van Diemen's Land	The brig was wrecked 2 or 3 nautical miles (3.7 or 5.6 km) from Cape Schanck, New South Wales. All on board survived. She was on a voyage from Geelong, South Australia to Launceston.
Evangelistra	France	The ship was wrecked 22 nautical miles (41 km) east of Livorno, Grand Duchy of Tuscany.
Henry	United Kingdom	The sloop was wrecked on the Burbo Bank, in Liverpool Bay. All on board were rescued. She was on a voyage from Liverpool, Lancashire to Amlwch, Anglesey.
Katherine Jackson	United States	The ship was driven ashore and wrecked at Manasquan, New Jersey.
Margaretha	Duchy of Holstein	The ship ran aground on the Noyel Sand and was damaged. She was on a voyage from Tønning to Hull, Yorkshire. She was refloated and taken in to Cuxhaven.
Orion	United Kingdom	The ship was sighted in the Øresund whilst on a voyage from Königsberg, Prussia to a British port. No further trace, presumed foundered with the loss of all hands.
Périclés	France	The steamship was driven ashore and sank at Civitavecchia, Papal States. All on board were rescued by Ténaré (French Navy).
Peru	United Kingdom	The ship struck the Salthouse Bank, in the Irish Sea. She was subsequently driven ashore near Southport, Lancashire. She was on a voyage from Dundalk, County Louth to Preston, Lancashire.
Sexton	United Kingdom	The schooner ran aground on the Middle Sand, in the North Sea off the coast of Essex. She was on a voyage from Hartlepool, County Durham to London. She was refloated with the assistance of four smacks and taken in to Wivenhoe, Essex in a leaky condition.
Sterling	United Kingdom	The ship was wrecked on Grand Manan, New Brunswick, British North America. Her crew were rescued. She was on a voyage from Cardiff, Glamorgan to Saint John, New Brunswick.
Vesta	United Kingdom	The kuff was lost near Goeree. Her crew survived.

== 6 November ==
List of shipwrecks: 6 November 1848
Ship	State	Description
Adelaide	United Kingdom	The smack was driven ashore and wrecked on the Hurst Spit. She was on a voyage from Swanage, Dorset to Southampton, Hampshire.
Cape Packet	United Kingdom	The ship was destroyed by fire at Penang, Malaya.
Flora	United Kingdom	The ship ran aground of the Havre de Grina Rocks, 3 nautical miles (5.6 km) south east of Foula, Shetland Islands. She floated off but capsized and was abandoned.
Georges	France	The ship was driven ashore at Hartlepool, County Durham, United Kingdom. She was refloated on 10 November and towed in to Hartlepool for repairs.
Jessie	(United Kingdom of Great Britain and Ireland) Guernsey	The ship foundered in the Gulf of Finland with the loss of two of her crew. She was on a voyage from Guernsey to Saint Petersburg, Russia.
Libertas	Prussia	The ship sprang a leak and was abandoned in the North Sea (52°12′N 2°19′E). Her crew were rescued by Swendborg (Denmark). Libertas was on a voyage from Southampton to Memel.
Podi	Trieste	The ship was driven ashore near the mouht of the Semani and was abandoned by her crew. She was on a voyage from Trieste to Cork or Falmouth, Cornwall, United Kingdom.
Porcépie	France	The ship was driven ashore at Dunkirk, Nord with the loss of one life. She was on a voyage from Haiti to Hamburg. She had become a wreck by 9 November.
Robert	Sweden	The schooner was abandoned whilst on a voyage from "Harback" to Stockholm. Wreck floated to Storby grunden, Eckerö, Åland. Wreck, cargo and rigging was auctioned 8.2.1850 at Eckerö.
Senator	United States	The ship was driven ashore and damaged at Liverpool, Lancashire, United Kingdom. She was refloated in a waterlogged condition.
Thomas Ainsworth	United Kingdom	The ship was driven ashore at Blokzijl, Overijssel, Netherlands.
Uranus	Denmark	The ship was driven ashore and wrecked at Memel, Prussia. Her crew were rescued. She was on a voyage from Aarhus to Memel.

== 7 November ==
List of shipwrecks: 7 November 1848
Ship	State	Description
Altona	United Kingdom	The ship was wrecked on Saaremaa, Russia. Her crew were rescued. She was on a voyage from London to Saint Petersburg, Russia.
Catherine, and Fancy	United Kingdom; Stettin	Fancy was in collision with the schooner Catherine and was abandoned in the Baltic Sea 20 nautical miles (37 km) north of Stettin with the loss of a crew member. Survivors were rescued by Catherine, which was subsequently run ashore near Cammin, Rostock. Catherine was on a voyage from Scotland to Stettin.
Dorothea	United Kingdom	The ship was driven ashore and wrecked at Memel, Prussia with the loss of a crew member. She was on a voyage from Newcastle upon Tyne, Northumberland to Memel.
Frau Margaretha	Kingdom of Hanover	The ship was driven ashore on Düne, Heligoland. Her crew were rescued.
Niessina	Denmark	The ship struck rocks off Osmussaar, Russia and was abandoned by her crew. She was on a voyage from Saint Petersburg to Helsingør.
Oak	United Kingdom	The schooner was driven ashore on the Frische Nehrung, Prussia. Her crew were rescued. She was on a voyage from Dysart, Aberdeenshire to Pillau, Prussia. Oak was refloated on 12 November and taken in to Pillau in a leaky condition.
Petrel	United Kingdom	The ship ran aground on the Middle Sand, in the North Sea off the coast of Essex. She was on a voyage from Hartlepool, County Durham to London. She was refloated and taken in to Wivenhoe, Essex.

== 8 November ==
List of shipwrecks: 8 November 1848 sort=
Ship	State	Description
Allen Potter	(United Kingdom of Great Britain and Ireland) British North America	The ship departed from Baltimore, Maryland, United States for Liverpool, Lancashire. No further trace, presumed foundered with the loss of all hands.

== 9 November ==
List of shipwrecks: 9 November 1848
Ship	State	Description
Atrochia	(United Kingdom of Great Britain and Ireland) Jersey	The ship ran aground on the Muscle Scarf, in the River Tyne.
Catherine Elizabeth	United Kingdom	The ship was lost near Noordwijk, North Holland, Netherlands. Her crew were rescued. She was on a voyage from Groningen, Netherlands to London.
Hope	United Kingdom	The ship was wrecked at Wivenhoe, Essex. Her crew were rescued. She was on a voyage from London to Wivenhoe.
Onward	United Kingdom	The schooner was abandoned off São Miguel Island, Azores. She was on a voyage from Dartmouth, Devon to São Miguel Island. She was subsequently taken in.
Parrsboro'	United Kingdom	The ship was driven ashore at Kilroot, County Antrim. She was on a voyage from Belfast, County Antrim to Ayr.
Queen of the Isles	(United Kingdom of Great Britain and Ireland) Guernsey	The ship capsized and was severely damaged at Guernsey.
Speculator	United Kingdom	The ship sprang a leak and sank off Penzance, Cornwall. Her crew were rescued. She was on a voyage from London to Cork.

== 10 November ==
List of shipwrecks: 10 November 1848
Ship	State	Description
Express	(United Kingdom of Great Britain and Ireland) Gibraltar	The ship was driven ashore between Adra and Roquetas de Mar, Spain. She was on a voyage from Gibraltar to Malta.
Hastellina	United Kingdom	The ship ran aground at South Shields, County Durham. Shew as on a voyage from Leith, Lothian to South Shields. She was refloated.
Jean Jacques	Belgium	The ship capsized off Cannes, Alpes-Maritimes. Her crew were rescued.
Reviresco	Hamburg	The ship was driven ashore in the Elbe downstream of Cuxhaven. She was on a voyage from Cuxhaven to Grangemouth, Stirlingshire, United Kingdom. She was refloated the next day and resumed her voyage.

== 11 November ==
List of shipwrecks: 11 November 1848
Ship	State	Description
Rattler	United Kingdom	The ship was run aground on the Mutchel Scap, off the coast of County Durham.
Zenobia	United Kingdom	The ship was driven ashore at Helsingør, Denmark. She was on a voyage from Liverpool, Lancashire to Danzig. She was refloated on 14 November and resumed her voyage.

== 10 November ==
List of shipwrecks: 10 November 1848
Ship	State	Description
Nautilus	United States	The full-rigged ship was wrecked at "Blanc Sablon", Labrador, British North America.

== 12 November ==
List of shipwrecks: 12 November 1848
Ship	State	Description
Caroline	United Kingdom	The ship sprang a leak and sank in the English Channel off Axmouth, Devon. Her crew were rescued. She was on a voyage from Cowes, Isle of Wight to Bridport, Dorset.
Maria	Kingdom of Hanover	The ewer was driven ashore on Scharhörn. She was on a voyage from Hull, Yorkshire, United Kingdom to Copenhagen, Denmark. She was refloated and taken in to Cuxhaven.

== 13 November ==
List of shipwrecks: 13 November 1848
Ship	State	Description
Burgundy	United States	The ship was wrecked on the Longsand, in the North Sea off the coast of Essex, United Kingdom. Of her 300 passengers, 99 were rescued and landed at Harwich, Essex; 68 of them by the smack Tryal (United Kingdom) Other survivors were rescued by Nais (United Kingdom). HMRC Diamond ( Board of Customs) also rescued survivors. Other vessels rescued survivors and landed them along the coast of East Anglia.
Caledonia	United Kingdom	The ship was abandoned in the Irish Sea. She was on a voyage from Maryport, Cumberland to an Irish port. She was taken in to Maryport the next day in a derelict condition.
Ianthe	United Kingdom	The ship departed from Alexandria, Egypt for Falmouth, Cornwall. No further trace, presumed foundered with the loss of all hands.
Lætitia and Catharina	Hamburg	The ship was driven ashore near "Bosch". She was on a voyage from Hamburg to Rostock. She was refloated and put in to Cuxhaven for repairs.
Richards	United Kingdom	The ship ran aground on the Zuide Haaks sandbank, in the North Sea off the Dutch coast. She was on a voyage from Newcastle upon Tyne, Northumberland to Amsterdam, North Holland, Netherlands. She was refloated and taken in the Nieuw Diep.

== 14 November ==
List of shipwrecks: 14 November 1848
Ship	State	Description
Atlantic	Bremen	The barque was wrecked on the Goodwin Sands, Kent with the loss of four lives. The lugger Prince of Wales (United Kingdom) was amongst the vessels that rescued the survivors. Atlantic was on a voyage from Bremen to New York, United States.
Aurora	United Kingdom	The ship was driven ashore and damaged near "Ekholm", Russia. She was on a voyage from Saint Petersburg, Russia to Newcastle upon Tyne, Northumberland. She was refloated.
Eliza	United States	The ship was wrecked at Swinemünde, Prussia. Her crew were rescued. She was on a voyage from Charleston, South Carolina to Swinemünde.
Ellen	(United Kingdom of Great Britain and Ireland) Jersey	The ship was driven ashore and capsized at Saint-Malo, Ille-et-Vilaine, France. She was severely damaged.
Emma	Greifswald	The ship was driven ashore on Rügen, Prussia. She was on a voyage from Newcastle upon Tyne, Northumberland, United Kingdom to Greifswald.
George	United Kingdom	The ship ran aground on the Herd Sand, in the North Sea off the coast of County Durham and caught fire when her cargo of quicklime got wet. Her crew were rescued. She was on a voyage from Sunderland, County Durham to Arbroath, Forfarshire. The wreck was towed in to South Shields, County Durham on 26 November.
Harriet	(United Kingdom of Great Britain and Ireland) New South Wales	The ship departed from Geelong for Hobart, Van Diemen's Land. No further trace, presumed foundered with the loss of all hands.
Jenny	United Kingdom	The flat sank near the Red Stones, in Liverpool Bay.
Jessie	United Kingdom	The ship was wrecked on the Smith's Rocks, in the Irish Sea off Ballycotton, County Antrim. Her crew were rescued. She was on a voyage from Limerick to Glasgow, Renfrewshire.
Njord	Sweden	The ship was driven ashore and wrecked near Dierhagen, Grand Duchy of Mecklenburg-Schwerin with the loss of a crew member. She was on a voyage from Stockholm to Lübeck.
Soundraporvy	Greece	The ship ran aground off Lepanto. She was on a voyage from Vostizza to Patras. She had been refloated by 22 November, resuming her voyage on that day.

== 15 November ==
List of shipwrecks: 15 November 1848
Ship	State	Description
Agnes	Kingdom of Hanover	The ship was wrecked on Terschelling, Friesland, Netherlands. She was on a voyage from Sunderland, County Durham, United Kingdom to Leer.
Anna Elizabeth	United Kingdom	The ship ran aground off Neuwerk. She was on a voyage from Hamburg to Stockton-on-Tees, County Durham.
Emily	(United Kingdom of Great Britain and Ireland) British North America	The ship was driven ashore and abandoned at Saint John, New Brunswick. She was on a voyage from Saint John to Boston, Massachusetts, United States.
Friendship	United Kingdom	The ship was driven ashore at Helsingør, Denmark. She was on a voyage from Saint Petersburg, Russia to Dundee, Forfarshire. She had been refloated by 18 November and had resumed her voyage.
Klintholm	Flag unknown	The jacht was driven ashore on the Grosser Broden Sand in a capsized condition with the loss of all hands.
Royal William	(United Kingdom of Great Britain and Ireland) Van Diemen's Land	The cutter was wrecked at "Wabb's Harbour". Her crew survived.
Swallow	United Kingdom	The schooner was wrecked on the Fahludd Reef, in the Baltic Sea. Her crew survived. She was on a voyage from Saint Petersburg, Russia to Liverpool, Lancashire.
Veloz	Brazil	The brig caught fire and was abandoned in the Atlantic Ocean. Her crew were rescued by Columbus (United Kingdom). Veloz was on a voyage from Maranhão to Porto, Portugal.

== 16 November ==
List of shipwrecks: 16 November 1848
Ship	State	Description
Brown	United Kingdom	The brig ran aground on the Maplin Sand, in the North Sea off the coast of Essex.
Eiche	Flag unknown	The ship was driven ashore at Stettin. She was on a voyage from Grangemouth, Stirlingshire, United Kingdom to Stettin.
Emilie	Stettin	The ship was driven ashore at Stettin. She was on a voyage from Newcastle upon Tyne, Northumberland, United Kingdom to Stettin.
Fortuneteller	United Kingdom	The ship was driven ashore at Stettin. She was on a voyage from Neath, Glamorgan to Stettin.
Koninginn von Schweden	Sweden	The ship ran aground at Swinemünde, Prussia. She was on a voyage from Grangemouth, Stirlingshire, United Kingdom to Swinemünde. She was later refloated.
Nathalie	Norway	The ship was driven ashore at Stettin. She was on a voyage from Bergen to Stettin.
Stolpemünde	Prussia	The ship was driven ashore at Stettin. She was on a voyage from Bergen to Stettin.

== 17 November ==
List of shipwrecks: 17 November 1848
Ship	State	Description
Drovgden	Norway	The galiot was in collision with the brig Circassian (United Kingdom) and sank off Copenhagen, Denmark. Her crew were rescued.
Einigkeit	Prussia	The ship foundered in the North Sea. Her crew were rescued. She was on a voyage from Newcastle upon Tyne, Northumberland, United Kingdom to Swinemünde.
Helen	United Kingdom	The ship was wrecked at Culpee, India. Her crew were rescued.
Uruguay	Prussia	The ship was taken in to Stolp in a derelict condition. She was on a voyage from Memel to a Scottish port.

== 18 November ==
List of shipwrecks: 18 November 1848
Ship	State	Description
Le Jeune Vincent	France	The lugger was driven ashore and wrecked near "Rhanashark". He crew were rescued. She was on a voyage from Bordeaux, Gironde to Cork, United Kingdom.
Little Queen	United Kingdom	The ship was driven ashore and wrecked at Passage West, County Cork. Her crew were rescued.
Lord Lynedoch	United Kingdom	The ship was lost between Seskar and the Nervo Islands, Russia. Her crew were rescued.
Magdalena	Prussia	The ship departed from Eckernförde for a port on the east coast of England. No further trace, presumed foundered with the loss of all hands.
Mary Ann	United Kingdom	The ship was driven ashore at Helsingør, Denmark. She was on a voyage from Saint Petersburg, Russia to Leith, Lothian. She was refloated and resumed her voyage.
William	United Kingdom	The ship was abandoned in the Atlantic Ocean. Her crew were rescued by Fanchon (flag unknown). William was on a voyage from Quebec City, Province of Canada, British North America to Liverpool, Lancashire.
William Davison	United Kingdom	The sloop was driven onto the Herd Sand, in the North Sea off the coast of County Durham. She was on a voyage from Stockton-on-Tees to South Shields. She was refloated and towed in to South Shields.

== 19 November ==
List of shipwrecks: 10 November 1848
Ship	State	Description
Anglo-American	United Kingdom	The brig was driven ashore on Lovells Island, Massachusetts, United States. She was on a voyage from Liverpool, Nova Scotia, British North America to Boston, Massachusetts.
Betsey	United Kingdom	The ship was wrecked near Isigny-sur-Mer, Calvados, France with the loss of all hands.
Clara	United States	The ship was driven ashore at Truro, Massachusetts with the loss of her captain. She was on a voyage from Cádiz, Spain to Portsmouth, New Hampshire.
Exile	(United Kingdom of Great Britain and Ireland) British North America	The brig was driven ashore on Great Brewster Island, Massachusetts. She was on a voyage from Yarmouth, Nova Scotia to New York, United States.
Le Josephine	France	The ship sprang a leak and was beached at Great Yarmouth, Norfolk, United Kingdom. She was on a voyage from Newcastle upon Tyne, Northumberland, United Kingdom to Bordeaux, Gironde.
Swannen	Denmark	The ship foundered off Borkum, Kingdom of Hanover. Her crew were rescued by Johanne Gesine (Bremen). Swannen was on a voyage from Newcastle upon Tyne to Assens.

== 20 November ==
List of shipwrecks: 20 November 1848
Ship	State	Description
Active	Kingdom of Hanover	The ship struck a sunken wreck and sank off the Domesnes Reef, in the Baltic Sea. She was on a voyage from Riga, Russia to the Meuse (Dutch: Maas).
Agnes	United Kingdom	The sloop foundered off the Isle of May. Her three crew survived. She was on a voyage from Newburgh, Fife to Glasgow, Renfrewshire.
Auricula	United Kingdom	The ship departed from St. Jago de Cuba, Cuba for Swansea, Glamorgan. No further trace, presumed foundered with the loss of all hands.
Ekanaa	Russia	The ship was holed by ice and became waterlogged at Kronstadt.
Elizabeth	United Kingdom	The brig ran aground on the Kettle Bottom, in the North Sea off the coast of Norfolk. She was refloated in a leaky condition and taken in to Great Yarmouth.
Friends	United Kingdom	The ship was run into by Prince Coburg (United Kingdom) and sank off Herne Bay, Kent. She was on a voyage from Christchurch, Hampshire to Middlesbrough, Yorkshire. She was refloated on 22 November and taken in to Whitstable, Kent.
Good Intent	United Kingdom	The ship was driven ashore at Ness Point, Suffolk. She was refloated and taken in to Lowestoft.
Jane and Ann	United Kingdom	The ship was run down by a brig and sank in the North Sea off Winterton-on-Sea, Norfolk with the loss of two of her crew. Survivors were rescued by Norfolk (United Kingdom). Jane and Ann was on a voyage from South Shields, County Durham to Lowestoft.
Klein Marie	Prussia	The ship struck a sunken wreck and was damaged. She was on a voyage from Charleston, South Carolina, United States to Königsberg. She put in to Egersund, Norway in a leaky condition.
Magnet	United Kingdom	The ship was driven ashore near Hellevoetsluis, Zeeland, Netherlands. She was on a voyage from Hellevoetsluis to London.
Mantura	United Kingdom	The schooner ran aground at Port Talbot, Glamorgan.
Olive	United Kingdom	The schooner was wrecked at Nantucket, Massachusetts, United States with the loss of all hands. She was on a voyage from Wilmot, Nova Scotia, British North America to Boston, Massachusetts.
St. James	United States	The ship was driven ashore and wrecked at Kilmore, County Wexford, United Kingdom. She was on a voyage from Savannah, Georgia to Liverpool, Lancashire, United Kingdom.
Union	(United Kingdom of Great Britain and Ireland) British North America	The ship was driven ashore between North Rustico and Brackley, Prince Edward Island. She was on a voyage from North Rustico to Trois-Rivières, Province of Canada.
Wave	United Kingdom	The ship was holed by ice 40 wersts (23.04 nautical miles (42.67 km)) off Krasnya Gorka, Russia and became waterlogged. Her crew were rescued.
William Henry	(United Kingdom of Great Britain and Ireland) British North America	The ship was wrecked at Plymouth, Massachusetts, United States with the loss of five lives. She was on a voyage from Prince Edward Island to Boston, Massachusetts.
William Watson	United Kingdom	The ship was driven ashore at Redcar, Yorkshire. She was on a voyage from London to Hartlepool, County Durham. She was refloated and towed in to Hartlepool.

== 21 November ==
List of shipwrecks: 21 November 1848
Ship	State	Description
Agnes	United Kingdom	The ship was driven ashore at Cape Condor, Spain. She was on a voyage from London to Cádiz, Spain and the River Plate.
Amalia	United Kingdom	The ship was wrecked east of the mouth of the Narva River.
Ann and Jane	United Kingdom	The schooner was run down by a brig and sunk in the North Sea off the coast of Norfolk. Her four crew were rescued by Norfolk (United Kingdom).
Euphrosine	France	The ship was driven ashore at Roscoff, Finistère. She was on a voyage from Newcastle upon Tyne, Northumberland, United Kingdom to Senegal. She was later refloated and taken in to Roscoff for repairs.
Gem	United Kingdom	The schooner was wrecked in Galway Bay with the loss of three of her crew. She was on a voyage from Limerick to Liverpool, Lancashire.
George	United Kingdom	The schooner was driven ashore near Redcar, Yorkshire. She was on a voyage from Sandwich, Kent to Middlesbrough, Yorkshire. She was refloated and resumed her voyage.
Hamburgh	United Kingdom	The schooner was driven ashore near Redcar. She was on a voyage from London to Middlesbrough. She was refloated and resumed her voyage.
Harbinger	United Kingdom	The ship was beached at Gothenburg, Sweden. She was on a voyage from Danzig to Leith, Lothian.
Hebe	United Kingdom	The schooner was driven ashore near Redcar. She was on a voyage from London to Middlesbrough. She was refloated and resumed her voyage.
Pallas	Netherlands	The ship was driven ashore near Équihen, Pas-de-Calais, France. She was on a voyage from Baltimore, Maryland, United States to Rotterdam, South Holland.
Phya	United Kingdom	The ship was wrecked off Hiiumaa, Russia. She was on a voyage from Saint Petersburg, Russia to London.
Samuel	United Kingdom	The ship was driven ashore and wrecked at Redcar. She was on a voyage from London to Middlesbrough.
Semiramis	United Kingdom	The barque was driven ashore and wrecked at Saltcoats, Ayrshire. She was on a voyage from London to the Clyde.
St. Nicholas	Russia	The ship was driven ashore on Naissaar. She was on a voyage from Saint Petersburg to Reval.
Union	United Kingdom	The ship foundered in the North Sea off Blyth, Northumberland. Her crew were rescued by Dispatch (United Kingdom). Union was on a voyage from South Shields, County Durham to Blyth.
Wilberforce	United Kingdom	The ship ran aground in the Eider at "Eitzenloch". She was on a voyage from London to Hamburg. She was later refloated and resumed her voyage.
Wyandotte	United States	The steamboat was wrecked in the Mississippi River upstream of Vicksburg, Mississippi.

== 22 November ==
List of shipwrecks: 22 November 1848
Ship	State	Description
Bird	United Kingdom	The brig was driven onto the Boulmer Rocks, off the coast of Northumberland. She was refloated on 1 December and taken in to Warkworth, Northumberland in a severely damaged condition.
Christian Packet	Norway	The ship was driven ashore on the south west coast of Læsø, Denmark.
Gondolier	United Kingdom	The steamboat was in collision with the steamboat Josiah Lawrence and sank in the Mississippi River 50 nautical miles (93 km) downstream of St. Louis, Missouri.
Imogene	United Kingdom	The ship was driven ashore and sanke on "Wolff Island", Russia. She was on a voyage from Saint Petersburg, Russia to London.
John French	United Kingdom	The brig was driven ashore at Donegal. She was refloated.
Lincoln	United Kingdom	The brig was driven ashore at Donegal. She was refloated.
Nostra Signora della Guardi	Kingdom of Sardinia	The brig was driven ashore and wrecked at Toulon, Var, France. Her crew were rescued.
Retep and Kinederf	Stettin	The schooner was in collision with an English brig and sank in the Dragoer Rinne. Her crew were rescued.

== 23 November ==
List of shipwrecks: 23 November 1848
Ship	State	Description
Antoine	France	The ship was wrecked at Cette, Hérault.
Diadem	United Kingdom	The ship was driven ashore at Kronstadt, Russia.
Elodie et Antoine	France	The brig was abandoned in the Atlantic Ocean with the loss of two of her crew. She was on a voyage from Cette, Hérault to Brest, Finistère.
Helena	United Kingdom	The ship was wrecked on the Roker Rocks, off the coast of Northumberland. She was on a voyage from London to Middlesbrough, Yorkshire.
Janet Kinnear	United Kingdom	The brig sank in the Gulf of Finland off "Dolgenoss", Russia. Her crew were rescued. She was refloated in 1849 and taken in to Saint Petersburg, where she was repaired.
Rapid	United Kingdom	The ship was driven ashore on Prøvestenen, Copenhagen, Denmark. She was on a voyage from London to Rostock. She was later refloated and taken in to Copenhagen.
Sophia	United States	The schooner departed from New York for Newfoundland, British North America. She was subsequently run down and sunk with the loss of all but one of her crew.
St. Cuthbert	United Kingdom	The ship was driven ashore and sank at Ballyferris Point, County Down. Her crew were rescued. She was on a voyage from Liverpool, Lancashire to Westport, County Mayo.

== 24 November ==
List of shipwrecks: 24 November 1848
Ship	State	Description
Annie McNabb	(United Kingdom of Great Britain and Ireland) British North America	The ship was driven ashore at Gouldsboro, Maine, United States. She was on a voyage from Boston, Massachusetts to Digby Nova Scotia. She had been refloated by 2 December.
Charlotte Carl	France	The ship was driven ashore at Kronstadt, Russia. She was on a voyage from Bordeaux, Gironde to Kronstadt. She was refloated and taken in to Kronstadt.
Diana	United Kingdom	The ship ran aground off Gotland, Sweden, She was on a voyage from Riga, Russia to Plymouth, Devon. She was refloated in late December and taken in to Ronehamn for repairs.
Sarah	United Kingdom	The ship was driven ashore and damaged near Donegal.
Sea Witch	United Kingdom	The brig was wrecked in Pontifex Bay, Guernsey, Channel Islands with the loss of eight of her eleven crew. She was on a voyage from Sierra Leone to London.
Snap	United Kingdom	The ship was driven ashore and damaged on The Rosses, County Donegal. She was on a voyage from Donegal to the Clyde.
William and Eliza	United Kingdom	The ship was in collision with Auckland (United Kingdom) in the Bristol Channel. She was subsequently driven ashore and wrecked on Skokholm, Pembrokeshire. Her crew were rescued. She was on a voyage from Newport, Monmouthshire to Liverpool, Lancashire.

== 25 November ==
List of shipwrecks: 25 November 1848
Ship	State	Description
Ann and Mary	United Kingdom	The ship was driven ashore and wrecked in the Bay of Luce.
Caroline	United Kingdom	The ship was driven ashore and damaged on Stroma, Orkney Islands. She was on a voyage from Quebec City, Province of Canada, British North America to Montrose, Forfarshire. She was refloated and consequently put in to Aberdeen in a leaky condition.
Christian August	Norway	The ship ran aground at Egersund. She was on a voyage from St. Ubes, Portugal to Stavanger.
Forest Monarch	United Kingdom	The ship was driven ashore and wrecked on "Inneskenagh", near Dublin with the loss of a crew member. She was on a voyage from Saint John, New Brunswick, British North America to Greenock, Renfrewshire.
Hero	United Kingdom	The schooner departed from Puerto Rico for Saint John's, Newfoundland, British North America. No further trace, presumed foundered with the loss of all hands.
Nova Scotia	(United Kingdom of Great Britain and Ireland) British North America	The ship ran aground off Seal Island, Nova Scotia. She was on a voyage from Yarmouth, Nova Scotia to Liverpool, Nova Scotia. She was refloated and put back to Yarmouth but ran aground and was wrecked.
Rambler	United Kingdom	The schooner was driven ashore and wrecked 10 nautical miles (19 km) south of Wexford. Her crew were rescued. She was on a voyage from Smyrna, Ottoman Empire to Liverpool, Lancashire.

== 26 November ==
List of shipwrecks: 26 November 1848
Ship	State	Description
Emma	United Kingdom	The ship was driven ashore and damaged on the North Counch. She was on a voyage from Hamburg to Sunderland, County Durham.
Emma	France	The brig was wrecked on the Bare Bush Key. Her crew were rescued. She was on a voyage from Savanilla, Republic of New Granada to Havre de Grâce, Seine Maritime.
Manligheten	Sweden	The ship was driven ashore and capsized near "Quilleback". She had been refloated by 30 November.
Mary Dugdale	United Kingdom	The ship departed from Cuba for Swansea, Glamorgan. Presumed subsequently foundered off the Bahamas with the loss of all hands.
Oxenbjerg	Denmark	The sloop ran aground on the Hattero Reef. She was on a voyage from Nyborg to London, United Kingdom.
Santa Spilliotizza	Malta	The ship was wrecked at Tunis, Beylik of Tunis. She was on a voyage from Malta to Falmouth, Cornwall, United Kingdom.
HMS Scout	Royal Navy	The Scout-class ship-sloop struck a rock and sank in the Min River, China. Her crew were rescued. She was later refloated.
Stenboeken	Flag unknown	The ship was beached at "Lyakhil". She was on a voyage from Hartlepool, County Durham to "Saltkallan".

== 27 November ==
List of shipwrecks: 27 November 1848
Ship	State	Description
Arietta	United Kingdom	The barque was wrecked on the Mixon Sands, in the Bristol Channel off the coast of Glamorgan with the loss of one of her fifteen crew. Survivors were rescued by the paddle tug Dragon Fly (United Kingdom).
Diana	United Kingdom	The ship ran aground on a reef off Gotland, Sweden. She was on a voyage from Riga, Russia to Plymouth, Devon. She was refloated on 21 December and taken in to Ronehamn for repairs.
Henry Dubignon	United Kingdom	The ship was wrecken near Nassau, Bahamas. She was on a voyage from Savannah, Georgia, United States to Liverpool, Lancashire.
Indus	United States	The ship was driven ashore 4 nautical miles (7.4 km) north of Smith's Island, North Carolina. She was on a voyage from Rio de Janeiro, Brazil to Baltimore, Maryland.
Phoenix	United Kingdom	The ship was wrecked at the mouth of the Rio Grande. Her crew were rescued. She was on a voyage from Cádiz, Spain to the Rio Grande.
Princess	United Kingdom	The ship ran aground on the Cross Sand, in the North Sea off the coast of Norfolk. She was on a voyage from Sunderland, County Durham to London. She was refloated on 29 November and resumed her voyage.
Prosperity	United Kingdom	The sloop ran aground and was severely damaged at Drogheda, County Louth. She was on a voyage from Dundalk to Drogheda.
Unternehmung	Hamburg	The ship was driven ashore west of Dunbar, Lothian, United Kingdom. She was on a voyage from Hamburg to Leith, Lothian. She was refloated and taken in to Dunbar in a severely damaged condition.

== 28 November ==
List of shipwrecks: 28 November 1848
Ship	State	Description
Arrietta	United Kingdom	The ship was wrecked on the Mixon Sands, in the Bristol Channel. She was on a voyage from Cuba to Swansea, Glamorgan.
Baltic	(United Kingdom of Great Britain and Ireland) Guernsey	The ship ran aground and sank at Littlehampton, Sussex. she was on a voyage from Littlehampton to London.
Brothers	United Kingdom	The schooner was driven ashore and damaged at Bideford, Devon. She was refloated on 3 December and taken in to Bideford.
Colossus	United States	The ship ran aground and capsized in the River Tyne. She was on a voyage from Newcastle upon Tyne, Northumberland, United Kingdom to New York. She was refloated the next day and beached.
De Kalb	United Kingdom	The steamboat was run into by the steamboat Cutter (United States) and capsized in the Cumberland River.
Harmonie	United Kingdom	The ship ran aground in the Kungsbaka Fjord. She was on a voyage from Newcastle upon Tyne to Stettin.
Isabella	United Kingdom	The sloop sank at Dundee, Forfarshire with the loss of her captain.
John and Richard	United Kingdom	The brig caught fire at Hartlepool, County Durham and was scuttled.
Margaret and Elizabeth	United Kingdom	The sloop was destroyed by fire at Broughty Ferry, Forfarshire.
Silva	United Kingdom	The ship ran aground on the Wester Nill, in the North Sea. She was on a voyage from Hull, Yorkshire to Hamburg. She was refloated and taken in to Hamburg.

== 29 November ==
List of shipwrecks: 29 November 1848
Ship	State	Description
Alford	United Kingdom	The ship was driven ashore at Newbiggin-by-the-Sea, Northumberland and was abandoned by her crew. She was refloated and taken in to Blyth, Northumberland.
Cheviot	United Kingdom	The schooner was driven ashore at Peterhead, Aberdeenshire. She was on a voyage from Bangor to Alnmouth, Northumberland.
Clydesdale	United Kingdom	The barque was driven ashore at Seamill, Ayrshire. She was on a voyage from Puerto Rico to Greenock, Renfrewshire. She was refloated on 11 December and taken in to Ardrossan, Ayrshire in a severely damaged condition.
Enigheten	Sweden	The ship sank in Onoala Bay. Her crew were rescued. She was on a voyage from Torrevieja, Spain to Karlskrona.
Euphemia	United Kingdom	The ship struck a sunken rock and sank off Lindisfarne, Northumberland with the loss of her captain from her four crew. She was on a voyage from Dunkirk, Nord, France to Grangemouth, Stirlingshire. She was refloated on 8 December and taken in to Berwick upon Tweed, Northumberland in a severely damaged condition.
Lafayette	Sweden	The schooner was driven ashore and wrecked at Seaford, Sussex, United Kingdom with the loss of two of her seven crew. Survivors were rescued by the Coast Guard. She was on a voyage from St. Ubes, Portugal to Uddevalla.
Sarah Elizabeth	United Kingdom	The ship was severely damaged by fire at Plymouth, Devon.
Sunflower	United Kingdom	The ship departed from Paraíba, Brazil for Liverpool, Lancashire. No further trace, presumed foundered with the loss of all hands.
Wensleydale	United Kingdom	The schooner ran into Abeona (United Kingdom) and sank off Happisburgh, Norfolk. Her crew were rescued.

== 30 November ==
List of shipwrecks: 30 November 1848
Ship	State	Description
Active	United Kingdom	The ship was wrecked near Canisbay, Caithness with the loss of three of her crew.
Bornholm	Bremen	The ship was abandoned in the Atlantic Ocean. Her crew were rescued by Plymouth (United Kingdom). Bornholm was on a voyage from New Orleans, Louisiana, United States to Liverpool, Lancashire, United Kingdom.
Jane and Mary	United Kingdom	The schooner was driven ashore at Ballyferris Point, County Down. She was refloated and resumed her voyage to Liverpool, Lancashire.
Jonge Jan	Netherlands	The ship was driven ashore and wrecked near Scheveningen, South Holland. Her crew were rescued. She was on a voyage from Portsmouth, Hampshire, United Kingdom to Rotterdam, South Holland.
Kezia	United Kingdom	The ship ran aground at Blyth, Northumberland.
Olive Branch	United Kingdom	The schooner was driven ashore and wrecked on South Ronaldsay, Orkney Islands with the loss of all but one of her crew. She was on a voyage from Wick to Thurso, Caithness.
Robert	United Kingdom	The ship sprang a leak and was beached at "Lehmberge" with the loss of a crew member. She was on a voyage from Danzig to an English port.
Treffler	Bremen	The ship foundered in the North Sea 50 nautical miles (93 km) north east of Spurn Point, Yorkshire, United Kingdom. Her crew were rescued by the smack Temperance Star (United Kingdom). Treffler was on a voyage from Bremen to Hull, Yorkshire.

== Unknown date ==
List of shipwrecks: Unknown date in November 1848
Ship	State	Description
Agnes	United Kingdom	The ship was lost in the Irish Sea before 16 November. One side of the vessel came ashore on St. Davids Island, Pembrokeshire on that date; the bottom came ashore at St. Davids Head and her name board at Strumble Head.
Alfred	France	The ship was lost between the mouth of the Charente and La Rochelle, Charente-Maritime before 3 November. She was on a voyage from Lima, Peru to Bordeaux, Gironde.
Alfred	United Kingdom	The ship was driven ashore on the Newbyn Rocks, off the coast of Northumberland. She was taken in to Blyth, Northumberland in a derelict condition on 29 November.
Ann	United Kingdom	The ship was abandoned in the Atlantic Ocean before 3 November.
Ann	United Kingdom	The ship was driven ashore at Barber's Point, in the Dardanelles before 9 November. She was on a voyage from Newcastle upon Tyne, Northumberland to Galaţi, Ottoman Empire. She had been refloated by 15 November.
Antina	Kingdom of Hanover	The ship was lost off Terschelling, Friesland, Netherlands. She was on a voyage from Emden to Grangemouth, Stirlingshire, United Kingdom.
Brilliant	United Kingdom	The ship was lost in the Bristol Channel. Her stern washed up at St. Ives, Cornwall on 14 November.
Calypso	(United Kingdom of Great Britain and Ireland) New South Wales	The ship was departed from Sydney for Wellington, New Zealand. Presumed foundered with the loss of all hands. Wreckage sighted off Cape Farewell, New Zealand on 20 January 1849 was thought to have come from Calypso.
Carmen	Spain	The brig was wrecked at St. John's before 29 November with the loss of all but two of her crew. She was bound for Manila, Spanish East Indies.
Clitus	United Kingdom	The ship was wrecked on a reef in the Sea of Marmora before 27 November. She was on a voyage from Varna, Ottoman Empire to Exeter, Devon.
Columbian	United Kingdom	The ship was driven ashore at Killybegs, County Donegal. She was on a voyage from Liverpool, Lancashire to Philadelphia, Pennsylvania, United States. She was refloated and put back to Liverpool for repairs.
Compte Roger	France	The barque was driven ashore at Theddlethorpe, Lincolnshire, United Kingdom. She was on a voyage from Newcastle upon Tyne to Toulon, Var. She was refloated on 15 November and taken in to Hull, Yorkshire, United Kingdom.
Dealy	United Kingdom	The ship was wrecked at sea before 11 November. She was on a voyage from South Shields, County Durham to an Irish port.
Dream	United Kingdom	The ship ran aground off Lepanto, Kingdom of Greece before 14 November. She was refloated.
Enigheten	(Russian Empire) Grand Duchy of Finland	The ship was driven ashore in the Gulf of Finland. She was on a voyage from Vaasa to Liverpool. She was refloated and put in to Copenhagen, Denmark, where she arrived on 24 November.
Felix Lingayen	Spain	The full-rigged ship was wrecked at Manila, Spanish East Indies between 24 and 29 November.
Frouwina Gesina	Netherlands	The ship ran aground in the North Sea before 4 November. She was on a voyage from Elbing to King's Lynn, Norfolk, United Kingdom. She was refloated put in to the Jade Bight for examination.
Hero	(United Kingdom of Great Britain and Ireland) New Zealand	The cutter was lost near Cape Campbell, New Zealand, late in November. All crew and cargo were saved.
Hero	United Kingdom	The ship ran aground off Hogland, Russia before 11 November. She was refloated and taken in to "Frederickseaven" in a leaky condition.
Isabella and Ann	United Kingdom	The ship was wrecked near Portrush, County Antrim.
Jacques	France	The ship foundered in the North Sea off the coast of the Duchy of Holstein before 10 November. Her stern washed up on Sylt.
Jane	United Kingdom	The ship was driven ashore near "Kiossegderessi", in the Dardanelles before 9 November.
Jane Dann	United Kingdom	The ship ran aground near "Haranlik" or "Karaulik", Ottoman Empire before 9 November. She was on a voyage from Bristol, Gloucestershire to Constantinople, Ottoman Empire. She was refloated on 14 November and resumed her voyage.
Jantina	Hamburg	The ship was abandoned in the North Sea before 6 November. Her crew were rescued by Jupiter (flag unknown). Jantina was on a voyage from the Firth of Forth to Hamburg.
Jemappes	French Navy	The Hercule-class ship of the line was driven ashore at Civitavecchia, Papal States before 2 November.
Jeune Alexandre	France	The ship was driven ashore on Skagen, Denmark. She was on a voyage from Cette, Hérault to Copenhagen. She was refloated and completed her voyage, arriving on 5 November.
Jezelina	Belgium	The ship was driven ashore on "Drogoe" before 29 November. She was on a voyage from Riga, Russia to Termonde, West Flanders. She was refloated.
Juanita	United States	The brig was abandoned in the Atlantic Ocean before 4 November. She was discovered on that date by Sea (United Kingdom) and set afire (49°17′N 68°49′W).
Jupiter	France	The ship was lost off the Île d'Oléron, Charente-Maritime before 3 November.
London	United States	The brig was abandoned in the Atlantic Ocean before 1 December.
Lord John Russell	United Kingdom	The ship was abandoned in the Atlantic Ocean before 3 November.
Louisa Augusta	Prussia	The ship ran aground at Pillau. She was on a voyage from Pillau to Leith. She was refloated and resumed her voyage, but consequently put in to Helsingør, Denmark for repairs. She arrived on 25 November.
Maid of the Mill	(United Kingdom of Great Britain and Ireland) New Zealand	The schooner was lost late in November. Wreckage was washed up at Mokau, near Whangaruru, New Zealand. All seven hands were lost.
Margaretha	Duchy of Holstein	The ship ran aground on the Vogelsand, in the North Sea. She was on a voyage from Tønning to Hull, Yorkshire, United Kingdom. She was refloated and was towed in to Cuxhaven, where she arrived on 5 November.
Marigo	United Kingdom	The ship was wrecked near Karadeniz Ereğli, Ottoman Empire before 25 November. She was on a voyage from Odesa to London.
Mary Ann	(United Kingdom of Great Britain and Ireland) Jersey	The cutter was lost whilst on a voyage from Jersey to Southampton, Hampshire with the loss of four or five of her crew.
Medus, or Midas	United Kingdom	The ship was abandoned in the Atlantic Ocean before 11 November.
Minerva	United Kingdom	The ship was wrecked on Labuan Island, Malaya. Her crew were rescued. She was on a voyage from Singapore to China.
North Briton	United Kingdom	The ship was abandoned in the Atlantic Ocean before 7 November.
Plencotarra	Spain	The ship was wrecked in Manila Bay before 1 December.
Regent	United Kingdom	The brig was driven onto the Herd Sand, in the North Sea off the coast of County Durham. She was on a voyage from Hamburg to South Shields, County Durham. She was refloated on 11 November and taken in to South Shields.
Saint Petersburg	Russia	The ship was driven ashore near Marstrand, Sweden. She was on a voyage from Saint Petersburg to London. She was refloated and taken in to Gothenburg, Sweden for repairs.
Samuel	United Kingdom	The ship was driven ashore at Point Nagara, Ottoman Empire. She was refloated.
Scotsman	United Kingdom	The ship was driven ashore on Vargö, Sweden. She was on a voyage from Sheerness, Kent to Riga, Russia. She was refloated and towed in to Gothenburg, Sweden, where she arrived on 4 November.
Selina	(United Kingdom of Great Britain and Ireland) New South Wales	The ship was driven ashore derelict in Keppel Bay before 6 November.
Sisters	United Kingdom	The ship was lost at Salina before 10 November.
Sophie	Belgium	The ship was wrecked near Barcelona, Spain. Her crew were rescued. She was on a voyage from Cette to Rouen, Seine-Inférieure, France.
Tjardina Cornelia	Belgium	The ship ran aground on the Nieuwe Braak before 24 November. She was on a voyage from Amsterdam, North Holland, Netherlands to Bremen.
Vigilante	Russia	The ship was abandoned in the Black Sea. She was on a voyage from Odesa to an English port. She was taken in to Bourgas, Ottoman Empire on 1 December.
Wanderer	United Kingdom	The ship was driven ashore on Cape Sable Island, Nova Scotia, British North America. She was refloated and taken in to Barrington, Nova Scotia in a leaky condition.
William	United Kingdom	The sloop ran aground on the Flood Sand, in the North Sea off the coast of County Durham before 18 November.
