= Medieval stained glass in Sweden =

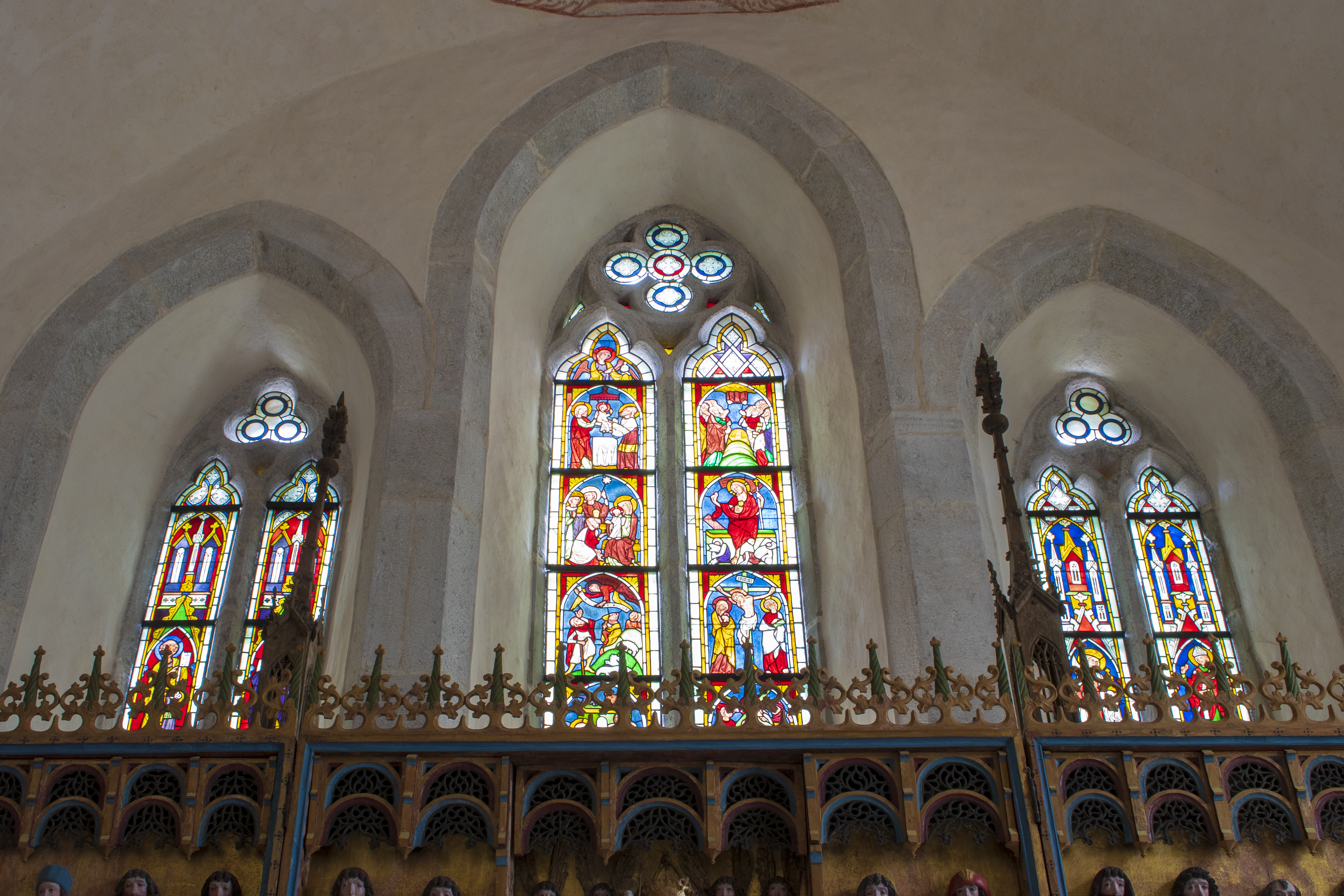
The choir windows of Lye Church on Gotland contain the largest set of intact medieval stained glass windows in the Nordic countries.

The surviving amount of medieval stained glass in Sweden is relatively small, compared to some other European countries. There are in total 165 medieval stained glass panes with figurative depictions surviving in 37 churches, constituting a total area of about 60 square metres (650 sq ft), a fraction of the original amount but still the largest amount found in any of the Nordic countries. Archaeological evidence and old drawings indicate that many more once existed.

The majority of the surviving glass paintings date from between approximately 1225 and 1350 and can be found mainly on Gotland. These stained glass windows can be roughly divided into groups on stylistic grounds. The oldest surviving stained glass windows can be found in Dalhem Church, and show influences from Byzantine art, probably conveyed via Germany, while the most recent date from the 15th and 16th centuries and are found in mainland Sweden. As elsewhere in Catholic Europe throughout the Middle Ages, stained glass was used to convey Christian themes through images to the churchgoers. A serious study of the medieval stained glass of Sweden by art historians began in the 19th century. In 1964, a complete catalogue of all preserved medieval stained glass in Sweden was published.

== History ==
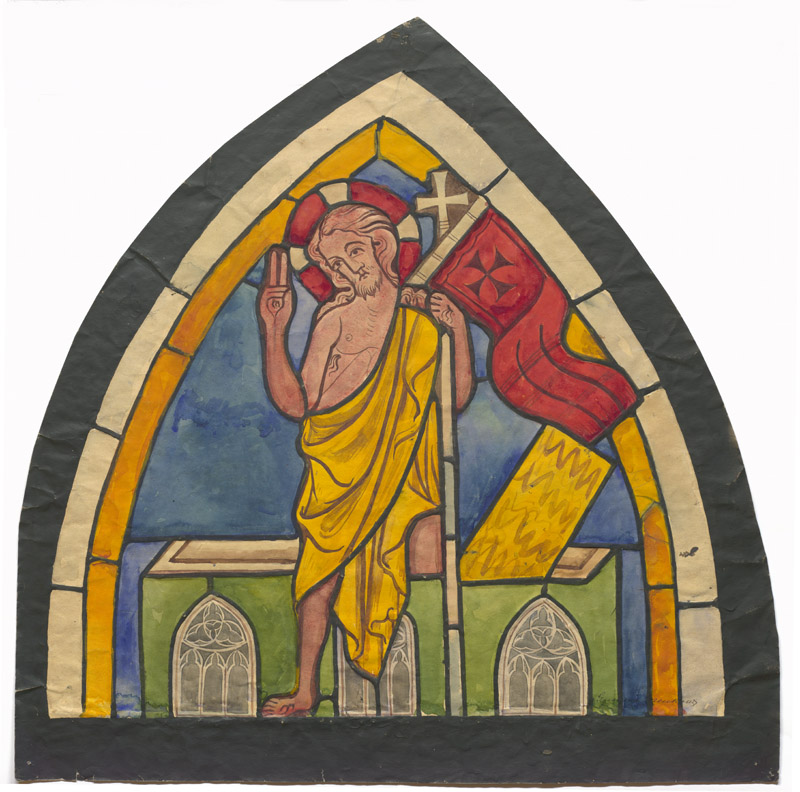
Watercolour of one of the stained glass windows formerly in Endre Church by Gustava Meukow. Knowledge about medieval stained glass in Sweden is partially derived from depictions like these of windows that have been lost.

Although the technique of making stained glass had been known since before the Middle Ages, the practice of decorating churches with stained glass windows became widespread in the territory of what is today Sweden first from the 1230s. On Gotland, where the vast majority of the remaining stained glass windows come from, stained glass windows were produced during a comparatively short time span of about a century and a half, from the second quarter of the 13th century to the end of the 14th century. This was a time of expansive church building and rebuilding on the island, which had grown rich from foreign trade. With the end of the 14th century, this period came to an end and church building, and with it the manufacturing of stained glass, ceased. Surviving stained glass windows from mainland Sweden date mainly from the 14th century and later, and there is no coherence in the body of surviving pieces comparable to that on Gotland. Furthermore, some of the medieval window panes today found on the mainland were originally from Gotland.

Judging from both written sources and archaeological discoveries, it was common to decorate churches lying within the current borders of Sweden with stained glass during the entire Middle Ages. In general, churches were equipped with stained glass windows when they were built. It is known from at least one occasion that a stained glass window was donated to a church by a clergyman, but contemporary written evidence of window production or acquisition is generally scarce. In cases where no actual windows remain, knowledge about their existence has been deduced from other sources. Some are known through earlier depictions, like the drawings made by Johan Peringskiöld of the stained windows of the church in Gamla Uppsala. He and other 17th-century antiquarians were primarily interested in heraldic and other historical traces that could be linked to the Swedish nobility, which is why they occasionally made drawings of stained glass windows showing coats of arms, but not necessarily other stained glass windows. Later, during the 19th century and the early 20th century, cultural historian Pehr Arvid Säve and artist and teacher Gustava Meukow made more comprehensive copies of the church windows, some since lost and dispersed, on Gotland.

In other cases fragments of coloured glass have been found in or near the church windows (e.g. at Jumkil Church). It may also be noted that between 1440 and 1540, at least eleven glaziers are known to have been active in Stockholm (at least one of them seems to originally have been German), but whether or not it can be assumed that it was part of their skill set to also produce decorated glass is a matter of differing opinions. Like in the rest of Catholic Europe, stained glass windows played a role in conveying Christian themes and stories to the congregation. Decorative glass windows are known almost exclusively from churches; there are in Sweden only a few known examples of profane stained glass painting from the time, of very simple, monochrome design (e.g. in Glimmingehus).

Only a fragment of these windows have survived. The exposed position and brittle material of the glass windows meant that the majority were lost to storms, fires and violence during the subsequent centuries. Following the Reformation, no new decorative glass windows were made, and often old windows were replaced with clear glass, as a more rationalistic view of Christianity was propagated. During the second half of the 19th century, the churches of Gotland furthermore suffered when individual window panes were removed and sold or given to private collectors, including public figures like King Charles XV of Sweden and painter Anders Zorn. Only at the end of the 19th century did stained glass windows in some cases again come to be installed. The first recorded conscious effort to conserve and preserve medieval stained glass windows in situ dates from the middle of the 19th century, when the British chargé d'affaires, a certain Mr. Gordon, allocated money for the protection of the windows in Lye and Endre churches on Gotland with chicken wire.

== Study and inventory ==
Attempts at a more systematic study of medieval stained glass in Sweden began in the 19th century. A comprehensive study of the collected preserved medieval stained glass on Gotland was carried out during the 1940s. While Sweden remained neutral during World War II and avoided direct warfare, the Swedish National Heritage Board in 1939 ordered all medieval stained glass windows on Gotland to be removed and brought to the mainland for safekeeping as a precautionary measure in case of war. A research team under the leadership of art historian Johnny Roosval took this opportunity to make a close study of all of the window panes, and published the results in a book in 1950. Roosval grouped the windows together and assigned notnames to the assumed artists or workshops on stylistic grounds. All in all, Roosval claimed to have identified 19 workshops, schools or artists producing stained glass for the churches of Gotland. In 1964, art historian Aron Andersson published a complete inventory of all known medieval stained glass windows in Sweden. Andersson acknowledges the notnames of Roosval but uses them only sparingly. He also highlights the difficulties in determining the artistic influences different workshops may have had on each other and whether some works came from different workshops or from different artists within the same workshop. He also points out problems determining a chronology between these supposed workshops, and raises the question of how difficult it is to convincingly show that there were any independent glass workshops on Gotland at all, given the lack of written sources. In the standard multi-volume art history of Sweden Signmus svenska konstistoria from 1996, Mereth Lindgren mentions only three of the notnames invented by Roosval.

In total, 165 medieval stained glass panes with figurative depictions and a few purely ornamental panes survive in Sweden, coming from in total 37 churches in the country. Of these, 31 are from churches on Gotland. Of the glass found on mainland Sweden, only a few are in their original location and none in their original framing. The total area of medieval stained glass amounts to about 60 square metres (650 sq ft), most of it from the time period between 1225 and 1350. Among the Nordic countries, Sweden has the largest amount of preserved medieval stained glass. Compared with a country like France or the United Kingdom, it is however a very small amount; the remaining medieval stained glass in Sweden would not suffice to decorate a middle-sized Gothic cathedral. A very small number of medieval stained glass has also found its way to Sweden in more recent times; e.g. the chapel at Ulriksdal Palace contains a few panes of Swiss origin, bought by Charles XV of Sweden.

== Style and development ==
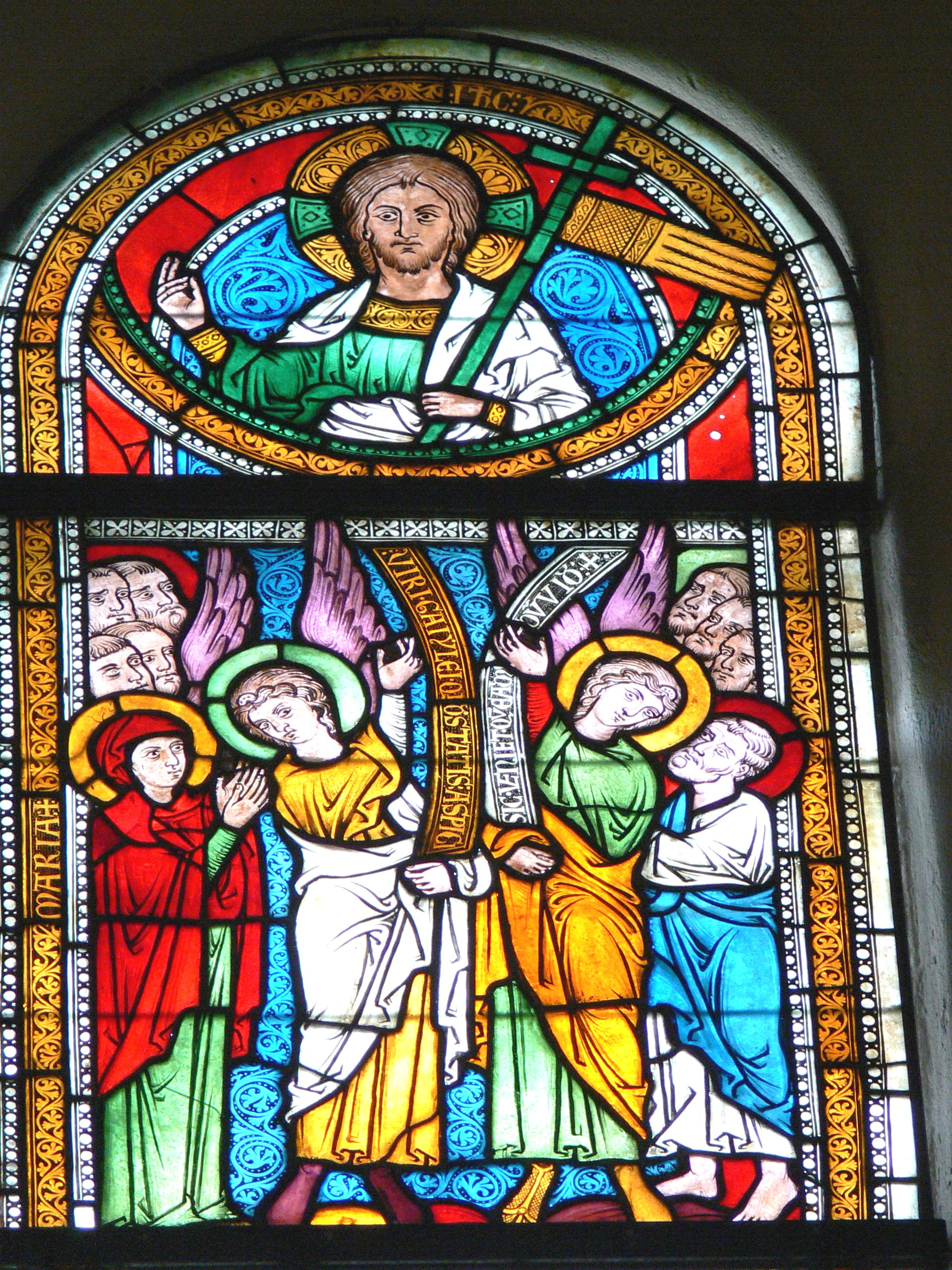
Dalhem Church: one of the oldest stained glass windows in Sweden, showing Byzantine influences mixed with Western attributes

Although stemming from a relatively short period of time, and despite the fact that a reduced number of window panes remain, certain stylistic characteristics and trends can be identified among the stained glass from Sweden. Particular attention has been paid to the churches on Gotland, since the by far largest amount of medieval stained glass comes from there. It has been assumed that the windows in these countryside churches were made by workshops operating in Visby. However, with the exception of Visby Cathedral, all the medieval churches of Visby are today in ruins, so there are no windows in Visby to compare the surviving windows with.

=== Early stained glass ===
The oldest stained glass windows preserved in situ in Sweden are found in Dalhem Church on Gotland. Five of the thirteen window panes in the eastern choir window are original; the rest date from a restoration done in a medieval revival style 1899–1914. Each window pane is approximately 50 centimetres (20 in) by 60 centimetres (24 in) large. These five windows probably date from c. 1230–1250; a somewhat later window in one of the northern choir walls (c. 1250–1280) show similar stylistic traits. These early works are characterised by an influence from Byzantine art. Stylistically related works can be found in Western Germany, particularly Westphalia, and notably in St. Elizabeth's Church, Marburg. Comparisons have also been made with windows in Barfüßerkirche in Erfurt and Neukloster monastery. The Byzantine influence, as seen e.g. in the representation of Christ Pantocrator in Dalhem, thus probably arrived with craftsmen from western Germany, who are also known to have been active as tradesmen on the island at this time. A clearly Western element in the aforementioned representation of Christ is thus e.g. the cross flag that Christ holds. Roosval also notes that a particular way of depicting the hair of Christ can be seen in the window in Dalhem, in Marburg and in the Byzantine mosaics in Cefalù Cathedral on Sicily; his conclusion is that the stylistic influence from Sicily may have reached Germany perhaps via the court of Emperor Frederick II, and from Germany to Gotland. Apart from Dalhem, window panes of broadly the same style and age are also known from Atlingbo, Barlingbo, Eksta, Endre, Lojsta, Rone, Sjonhem and Väskinde churches.

=== Early Gothic ===
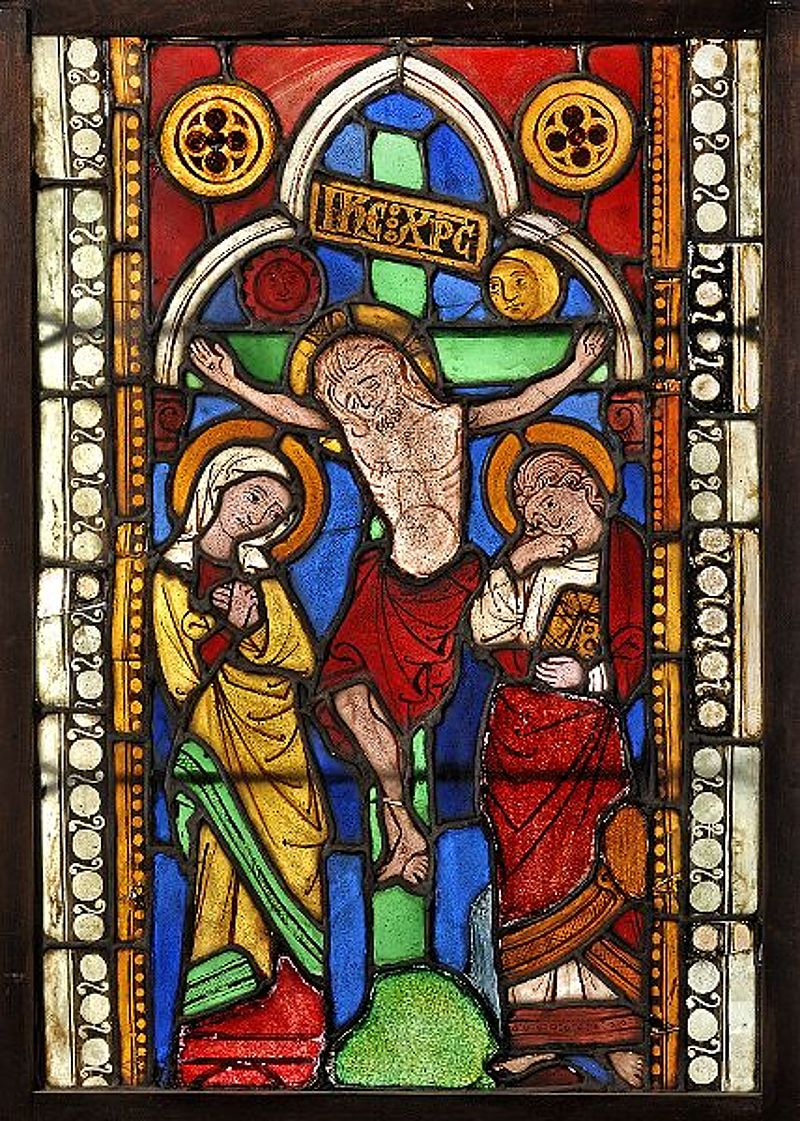
Early Gothic influences can be seen in the contrapposto of the figures in a window formerly in Klinte Church

During the period c. 1270–1310 stained glass windows were made for i.a. the churches of Alskog, Ardre and Klinte. The windows in Alskog are lighter than the earlier windows in Dalhem, and the stylistic influences may according to Roosval have come via Norway from England, rather than as before from Germany. Aron Andersson is critical of this assumption but notes that the composition has elements which would develop in many International Gothic works of art, and cites especially the contrapposto of the figures in the Crucifixion scene in Klinte. The windows in Alskog furthermore contain depictions of Gothic architectural elements. Some Byzantine elements still linger, however, for example in the representation of the Last Supper in Alskog.

=== High Gothic ===
A stylistic change took place in the first half of the 14th century. Many windows from this period survive on Gotland. Among the few well-preserved medieval stained glass windows on mainland Sweden, one from Skärkind Church in Östergötland and three from Sköllersta Church in Närke also date from this period. The only preserved medieval stained glass from Norrland is also a high Gothic pane originally from Bjuråker Church; it shows few similarities with other Swedish glass windows but is stylistically close to windows found in Wienhausen Abbey, Germany. The most well-preserved set of medieval stained glass windows however, is that of Lye Church; it is the most well-preserved set of medieval stained glass in the Nordic countries. The style of these windows may have been influenced by English or northern German (possibly Lübeck) contemporary art. The Gothic character is expressed through elongated, ethereal figures, an airy composition, a delicate ornamentation, and a cooler scale of colours. In some panes the iconography is also decidedly Gothic (e.g. in the depiction of one of the figures in the mocking of Jesus scene), even though the representation of subject matter on Gotland remained conservative. Other churches with high Gothic windows on Gotland are Bunge, Burs, Eskelhem, Etelhem and Vall.

=== Middle and second half of the 14th century ===
This period is called "counter-Gothic" in Swedish literature, and indicates heavier lines and coarser figures. The colours are sharper and the depictions more clearly narrative than in earlier windows, with attempts at a more realistic depiction of subjects including attempts at rendering a correct perspective. The iconography was partially renewed, for example in the treatment of the nativity scene formerly in Hörsne Church, or as in the relatively well-preserved suite of stained glass windows still in Hejde Church. The latter is also the last of the medieval church windows found on Gotland; no later examples are known. They date from the late 14th century. Other examples are known from Barlingbo, Hablingbo and Mästerby churches.

=== Later stained glass ===
A fragmentary amount of stained glass paintings from the 15th and 16th century survive on mainland Sweden. These are of a significantly different style than the earlier works; rather than using several pieces of coloured glass to build a kind of mosaic, the technique used during this time is to paint on clear glass, creating a very different impression. An example is the glass pane depicting the Coronation of the Virgin originally in Torsång Church.

== Bibliography ==
- Andersson, Aron (1964). Die Glasmalereien des Mittelalters in Skandinavien (Corpus vitrearum Medii Aevi Skandinavien) (in German). Stockholm: Kungl. Vitterhets-, historie- och antikvitetsakademien (Royal Swedish Academy of Letters, History and Antiquities).
- von Bonsdorff, Jan (1996). "Hantverkare i senmedeltidens Stockholm". In Augustsson, Jan-Erik (ed.). Den gotiska konsten. Signums svenska konsthistoria (in Swedish). Signum. pp. 442–450. ISBN 9187896257.
- Lindblom, Andreas (1914). "Gamla och nya svenska glasmålningar". Teknisk Tidskrift. Arkitektur. (in Swedish) (44): 71–78.
- Lindgren, Mereth (1996). "Glasmålningarna". In Augustsson, Jan-Erik (ed.). Den gotiska konsten. Signums svenska konsthistoria (in Swedish). Signum. pp. 413–419. ISBN 9187896257.
- Roosval, Johnny (1950). Gotländsk vitriarius (in Swedish). Stockholm: Generalstabens litografiska anstalts förlag.
