= Sjonhem Church =

- Sjonhems kyrka
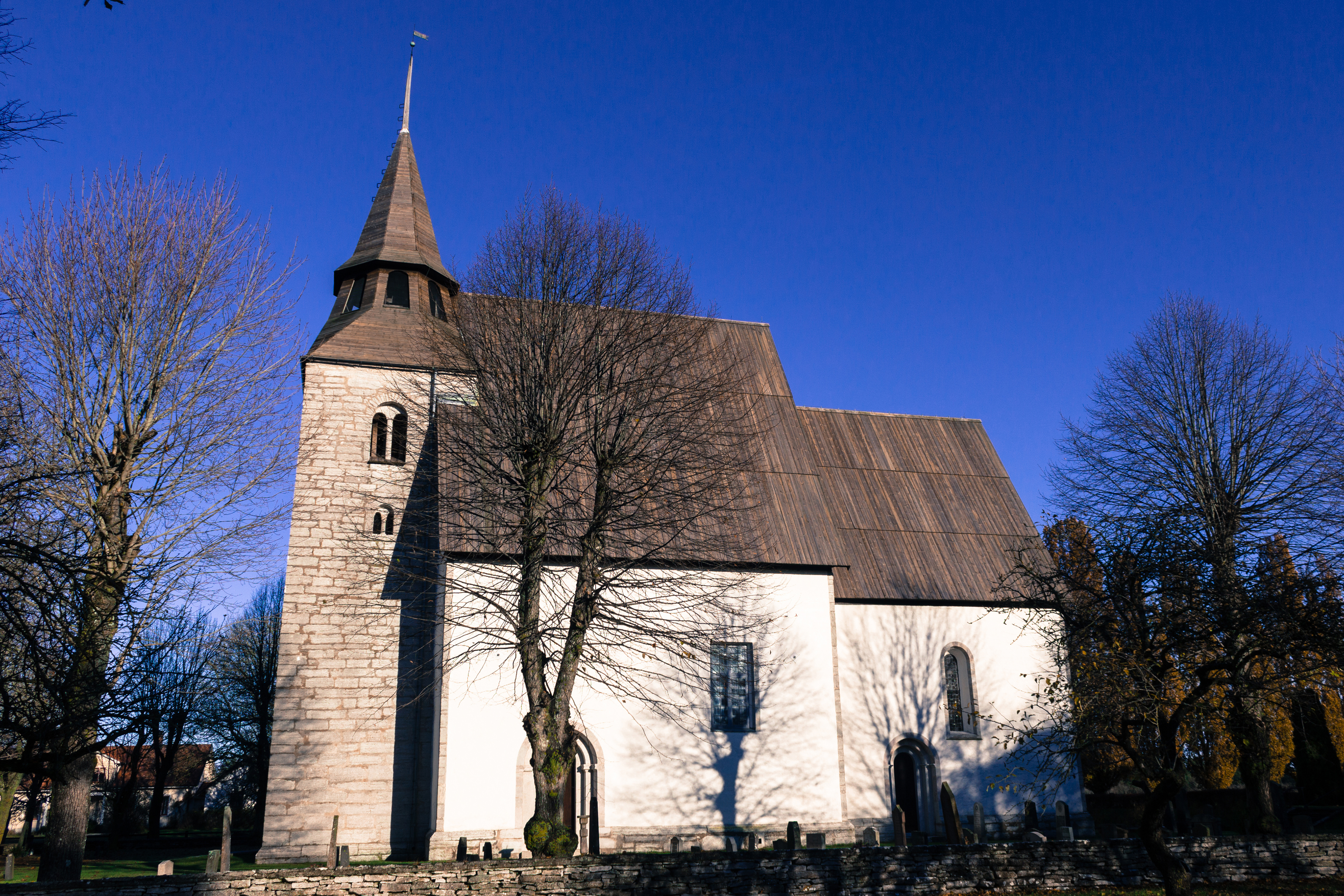
- Sjonhem Church, view of the south facade

- Location within Gotland
- 57°29′08″N 18°31′14″E
- Country: Sweden
- Denomination: Church of Sweden

Sjonhem Church (Swedish: Sjonhems kyrka) is a medieval church on the island of Gotland, Sweden. It belongs to the Diocese of Visby.

== History and architecture ==
The oldest part of the current church is the tower, which was built in the 13th century. Originally it was attached to a much smaller, Romanesque church. The choir and nave was however torn down and replaced with the current structure during the middle of the 13th century. Inside, church murals decorate the vaults; these also date from the 13th century. The church also has preserved medieval stained glass windows. A crucifix on the altar is somewhat later, dating from the 14th century. The baptismal font is however considerably older, dating from the 12th century and thus older than the church itself. It was made by the stonemason known as Hegvald. The church has been largely unaltered since the Middle Ages; the greatest change occurred in 1818 when the sacristy was built.
