= Endre, Gotland =

Endre
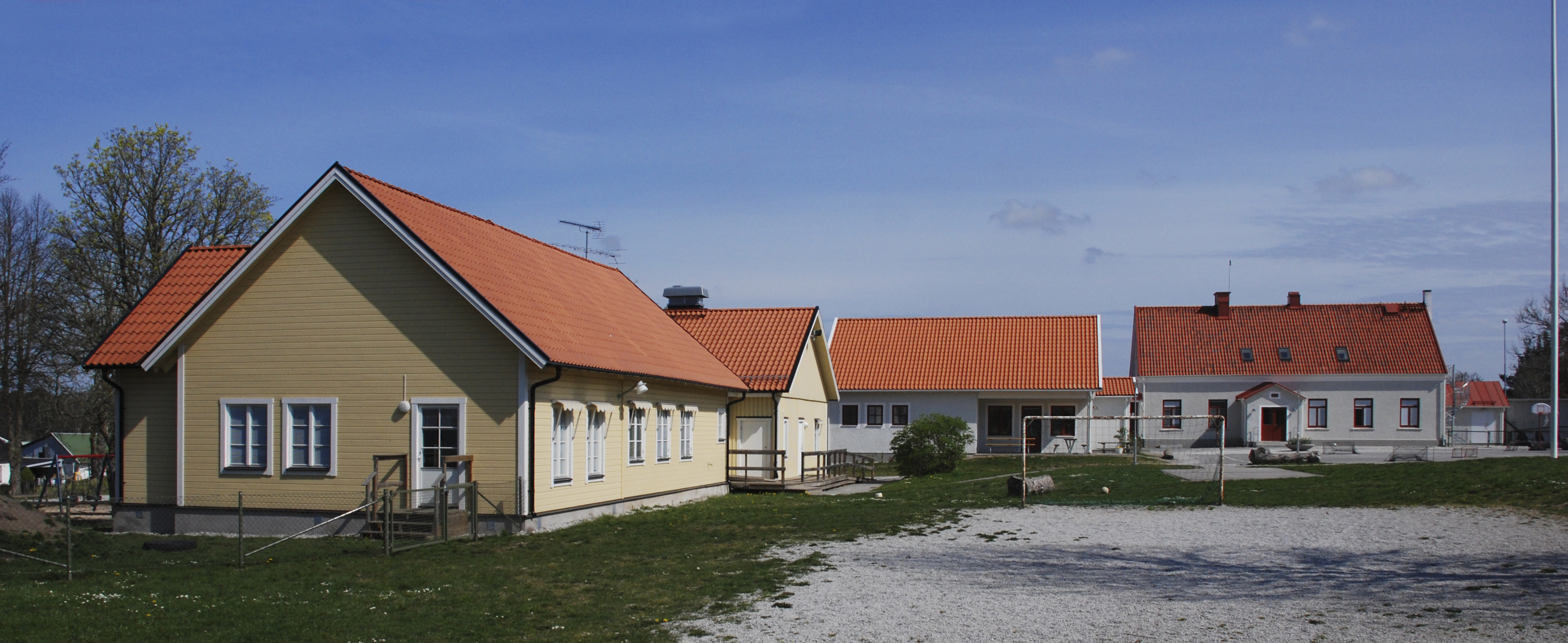
- Endre School

- Location within Gotland
- Coordinates: 57°36′36″N 18°27′55″E
- Country: Sweden
- Province: Gotland
- County: Gotland County
- Municipality: Gotland Municipality

Area
  - Total: 23.69 km^{2} (9.15 sq mi)

Population (2014)
  - Total: 348
- Time zone: UTC+1 (CET)
  - Summer (DST): UTC+2 (CEST)

Endre is a populated area, a socken (not to be confused with parish), on the Swedish island of Gotland. It comprises the same area as the administrative Endre District, established on 1 January 2016.

== Geography ==
Endre is situated in the central part of Gotland, just east of Visby. The medieval Endre Church is located in the socken. As of 2019, Endre Church belongs to Endre parish in Romaklosters pastorat.

The Ölbäck (litt. "Beer stream") nature reserve is in Endre. The 99 ha (240 acres) reserve was designated a Natura 2000 area in 2004. It is named after the now razed Ölbäck Inn, a tavern located about 2.8 km (1.7 mi) from Visby, where peasants and traders used to stop on their way from market. In the north part of the reserve is a stone cross, erected to commemorate the place where a priest, Mr Jörgen, is said to have been killed by an eagle as he was riding home to Endre in 1336.
