= Klinte =

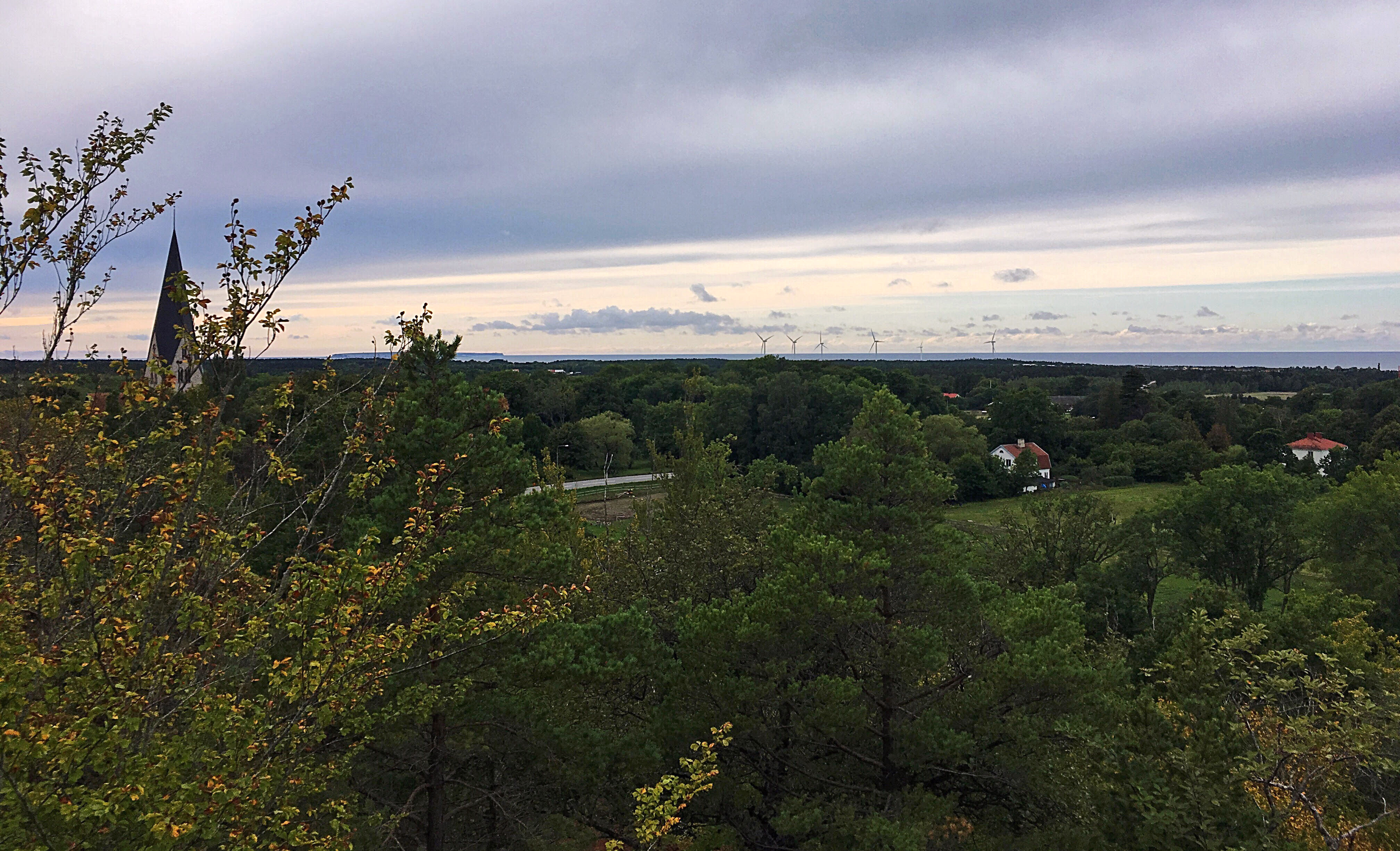
- View over Klinte

- Location within Gotland
- Coordinates: 57°22′42″N 18°13′55″E
- Country: Sweden
- Province: Gotland
- County: Gotland County
- Municipality: Gotland Municipality

Area
  - Total: 29.14 km^{2} (11.25 sq mi)

Population (2016)
  - Total: 1,569
- Time zone: UTC+1 (CET)
  - Summer (DST): UTC+2 (CEST)

Klinte is a populated socken on the Swedish island of Gotland. It comprises the same area as the administrative Klinte District, established on 1 January 2016.

== Geography ==
Klinte is the name of the socken as well as the district. It was also the name of the small village surrounding the medieval Klinte Church, sometimes referred to as Klinte kyrkby. In 2015, that small locality was merged with the larger locality Klintehamn. Klinte is situated on the central west coast of Gotland where it straddles the slopes of limestone cliffs (known as klinten) surrounding a natural harbor.

As of 2019, Klinte Church and Klinte Harbor Church belong to Klinte parish in Klinte pastorat.

== Events ==
Since the first half of the 19th century, the annual Klinte Market is one of the major autumn markets on Gotland. There are five official markets held on the island in August–October: Slite, Havdhem, Kräklingbo, Klintehamn and Hemse, each usually spanning a weekend.
