= Rone Church =

- Rone kyrka
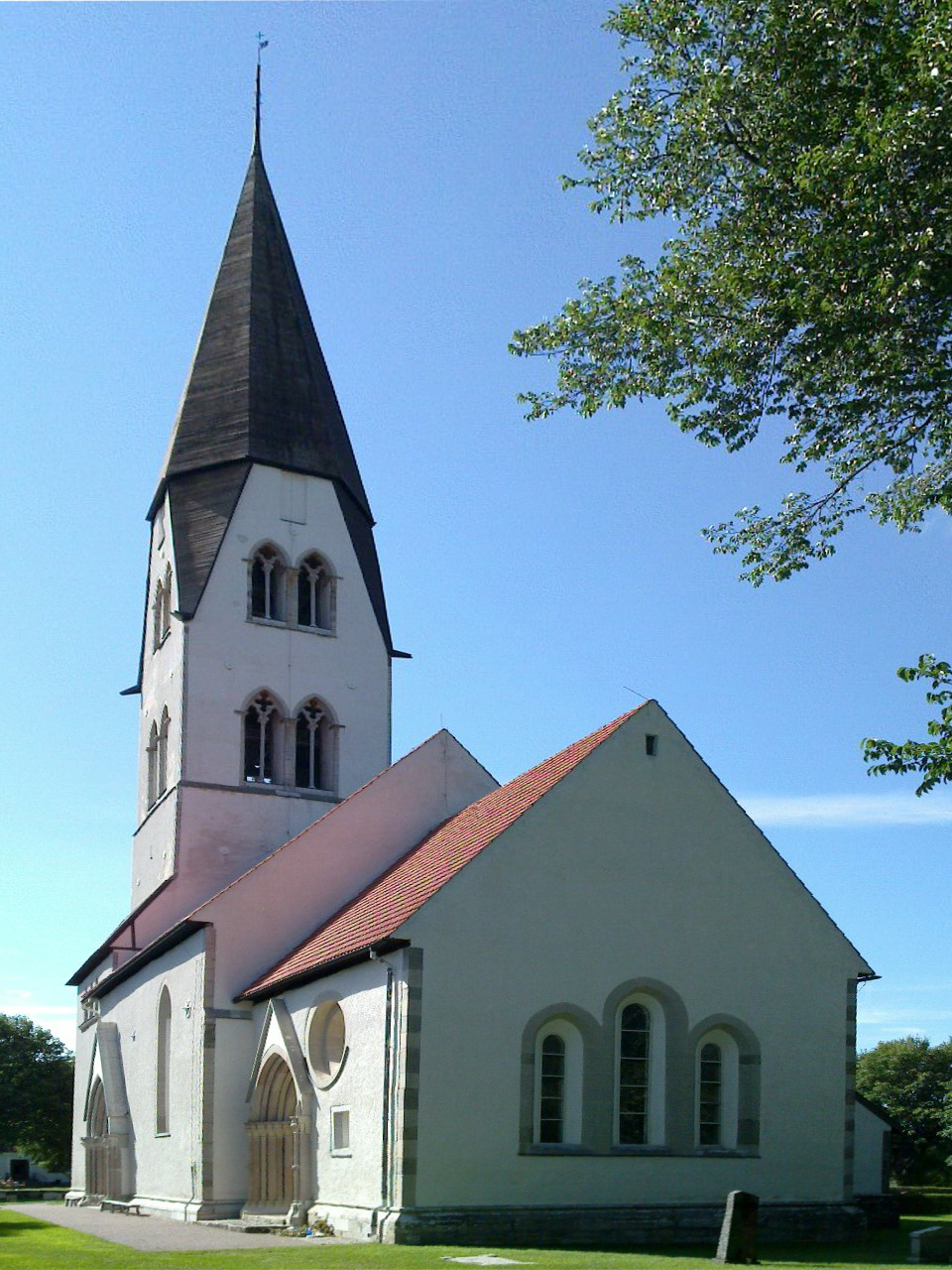
- Rone Church, view of the exterior

- Location on Gotland
- 57°12′32″N 18°26′28″E
- Country: Sweden
- Denomination: Church of Sweden

Administration
- Diocese: Visby

Rone Church (Swedish: Rone kyrka) is a medieval church in Rone on the Swedish island of Gotland. The Gothic church contains a number of medieval murals. It is part of the Church of Sweden and lies in the Diocese of Visby.

== History ==
The presently visible, Gothic church was very probably preceded by a smaller, Romanesque church. Of this first church, nothing remains except a few fragments, later incorporated into the Gothic church. The oldest parts of the present structure are the nave and choir, erected c. 1300, with the lower part of the tower from the same date. It was extended upwards during the middle of the 14th century, making the tall tower the youngest part of the church. The church has remained largely unchanged ever since.

A renovation was carried out in 1913–15, and again in 1954–55 by architect Eiler Graebe.

== Architecture ==
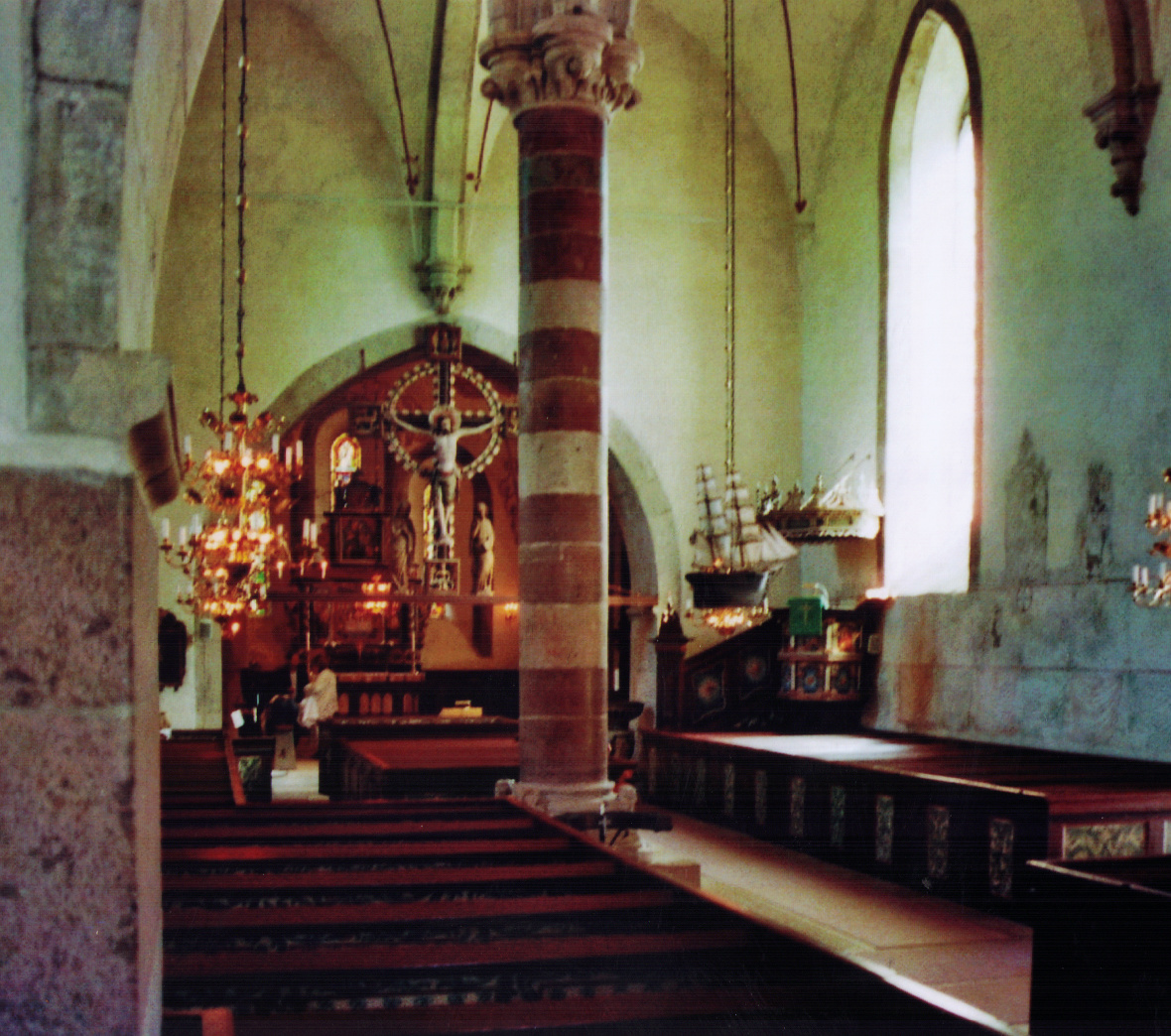
Interior, view towards the choir

The church is a relatively homogeneous Gothic church. The 60-metre (200 ft) tall tower has been used as a navigational aid ever since the Middle Ages. It was made by the same stonemason and workshop responsible for creating the towers at Öja, Stånga, Dalhem and Gothem churches, an anonymous artist or workshop to whom art historians have assigned the notname Egypticus. The northern portal of the tower has a stone relief depicting Saint Botvid, lying on a fish; a motif found on all the churches by Master Egypticus. The two southern portals of the church (leading to the nave and choir, respectively) also feature sculpted capitals.

Inside, the church is decorated with medieval murals from two different periods. The oldest, dating from c. 1300, are purely decorative, depicting floral motifs. The other set dates from the middle of the 15th century and have been identified as being by the Master of the Passion of Christ. They display scenes from the Passion of Christ, the childhood of Christ and (possibly) the Binding of Isaac. The church also still has some medieval stained glass window panes. Medieval stained glass in Sweden survives in only about thirty churches. The ones in Rone are among the oldest of their kind on Gotland and may originally have been placed in the earlier, Romanesque church. They are now placed in the three east windows and were supplemented with imitations during the 1913-15 renovation. The medieval stained glass windows depict scenes from the childhood of Christ, the raising of Lazarus, Mary Magdalene and other religious motifs.

Among the church furnishings, the triumphal cross and its two adjacent figures depicting Mary and John the Evangelist is a locally crafted piece made c. 1400. A medieval cope has also been preserved in the church collections. The other furnishings date from after the reformation. The altarpiece is from 1694 and the pulpit from 1595. The baptismal font was made in 1664 while the well-preserved pews date from the 17th and 18th centuries. The organ is from 1876.

Rone church has been proved to be the tallest church on the island Gotland.
