= Endre Church =

- Endre kyrka
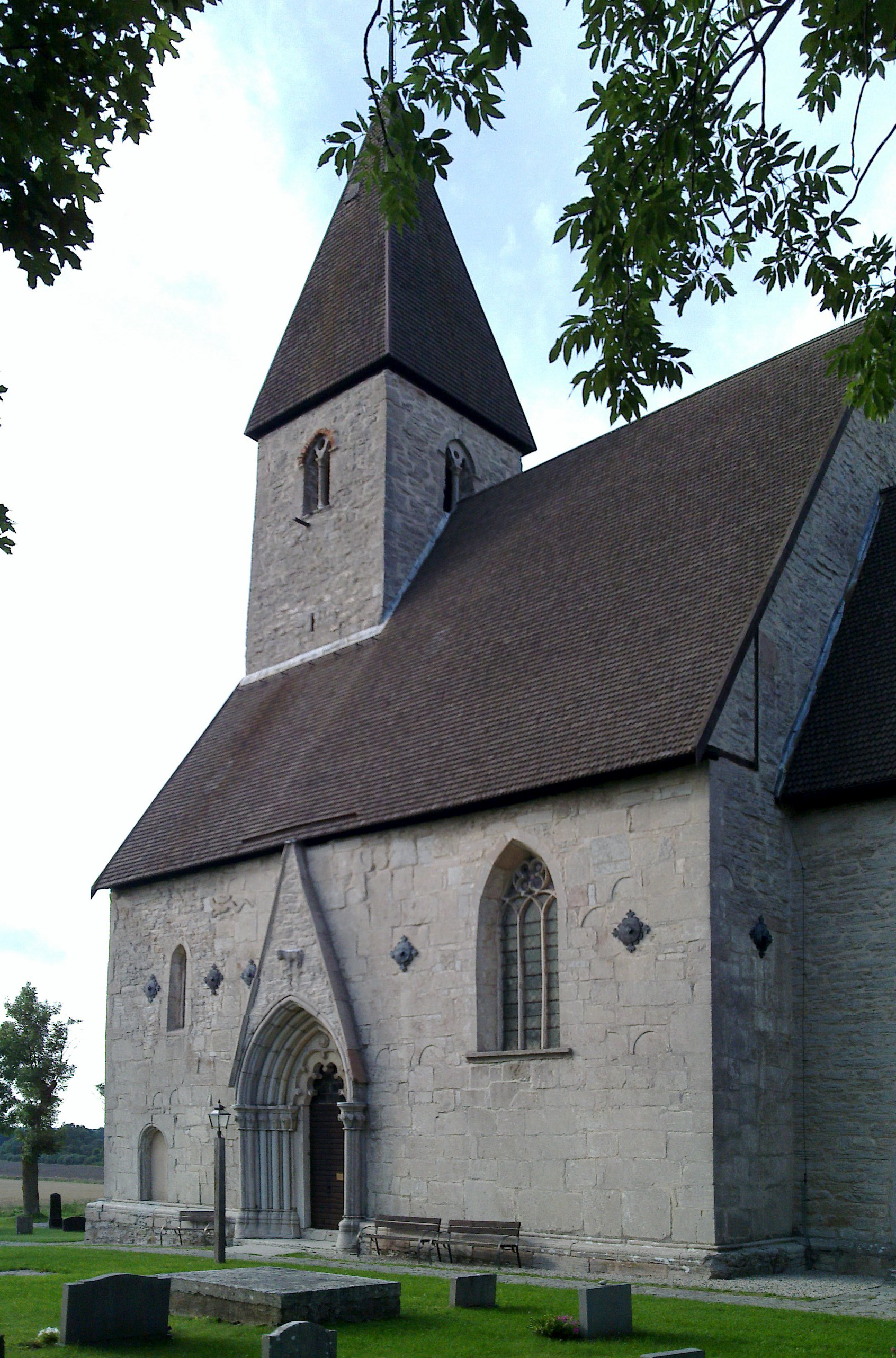
- Endre Church, view of the exterior

- Location on Gotland
- 57°36′37″N 18°27′55″E
- Country: Sweden
- Denomination: Church of Sweden

Administration
- Diocese: Visby

Endre Church (Swedish: Endre kyrka) is a medieval church in Endre on the Swedish island of Gotland, in the Diocese of Visby, built from the 12th to early 14th century. It contains medieval murals and several medieval furnishings, and belongs to the Church of Sweden.

== History and architecture ==
The presently visible church was preceded by an older, Romanesque church. Of this church, only the tower, built in the 12th century and heightened in the 14th, remains. A few stone sculptures have also been reused in later churches, e.g. one sculpture depicting a dragon and another a lion. These are now immured in the southern façade of the church. The rest of the church dates from the 13th century (the choir and sacristy) and the early 14th (the nave). The building material of the church is limestone.

Apart from the aforementioned Romanesque sculptures, the exterior of the church is also adorned with sculpted portals, both Romanesque and Gothic in style.

Internally, the church is decorated with medieval murals made by the artist known as the Master of the Passion of Christ in the middle of the 15th century. The paintings were uncovered during a renovation in 1915. The church also has several preserved stained glass window panes, one of only a few cases of medieval stained glass in Sweden still in its original location. Furthermore, the altarpiece is medieval from the late 14th century, as is a preserved church tabernacle. The triumphal cross dates from circa 1300, and the baptismal font, possibly made by the artist Hegvald, is a Romanesque piece from the 12th century, richly decorated.

The church lies in a cemetery that is surrounded by a low limestone wall, in which a medieval lychgate still survives.

Endre Church belongs to the Church of Sweden and lies within the Diocese of Visby.
