= Ronehamn =

Place in Gotland, Sweden

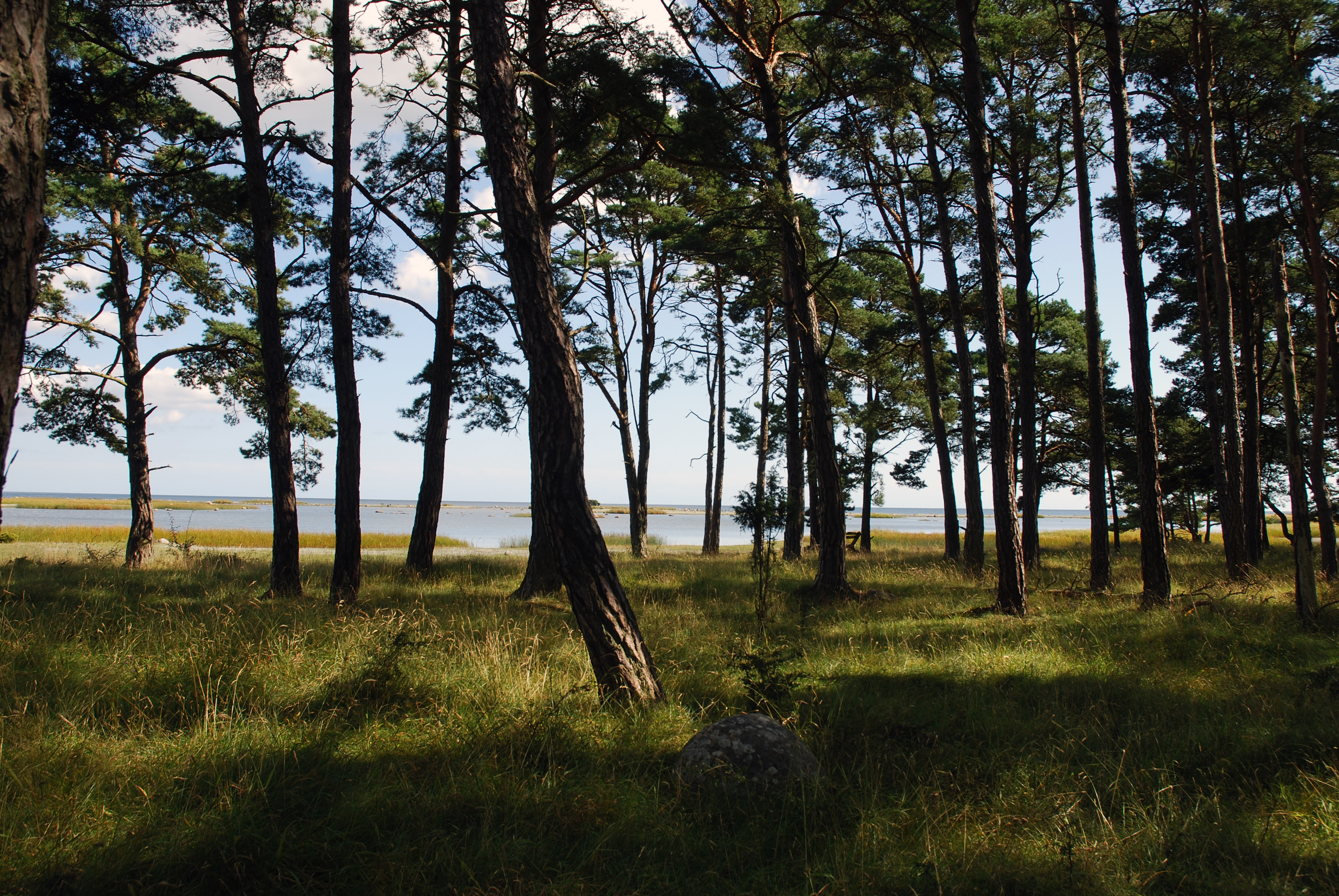
- Ronehamn beach

- Location within Gotland
- Coordinates: 57°10′28″N 18°29′8″E
- Country: Sweden
- Province: Gotland
- County: Gotland County
- Municipality: Gotland Municipality

Area
  - Total: 0.34 km^{2} (0.13 sq mi)

Population (2005-12-31)
  - Total: 129
  - Density: 374/km^{2} (970/sq mi)
- Time zone: UTC+1 (CET)
  - Summer (DST): UTC+2 (CEST)

Ronehamn (Swedish pronunciation: [rʊnɛˈhamn]) is a settlement in Rone on the southeast coast of Gotland island, Sweden, with 129 inhabitants in 2005.

== History ==
Several Bronze Age grooves have been found in Ronehamn. The best examples are those at Rone Halor II.

During the second half of the 19th century, Ronehamn was the second most important harbor on Gotland after Visby. In 1902, one of the island's railways was extended to Ronehamn. The railway is now discontinued.
