= Rone, Gotland =

Rone
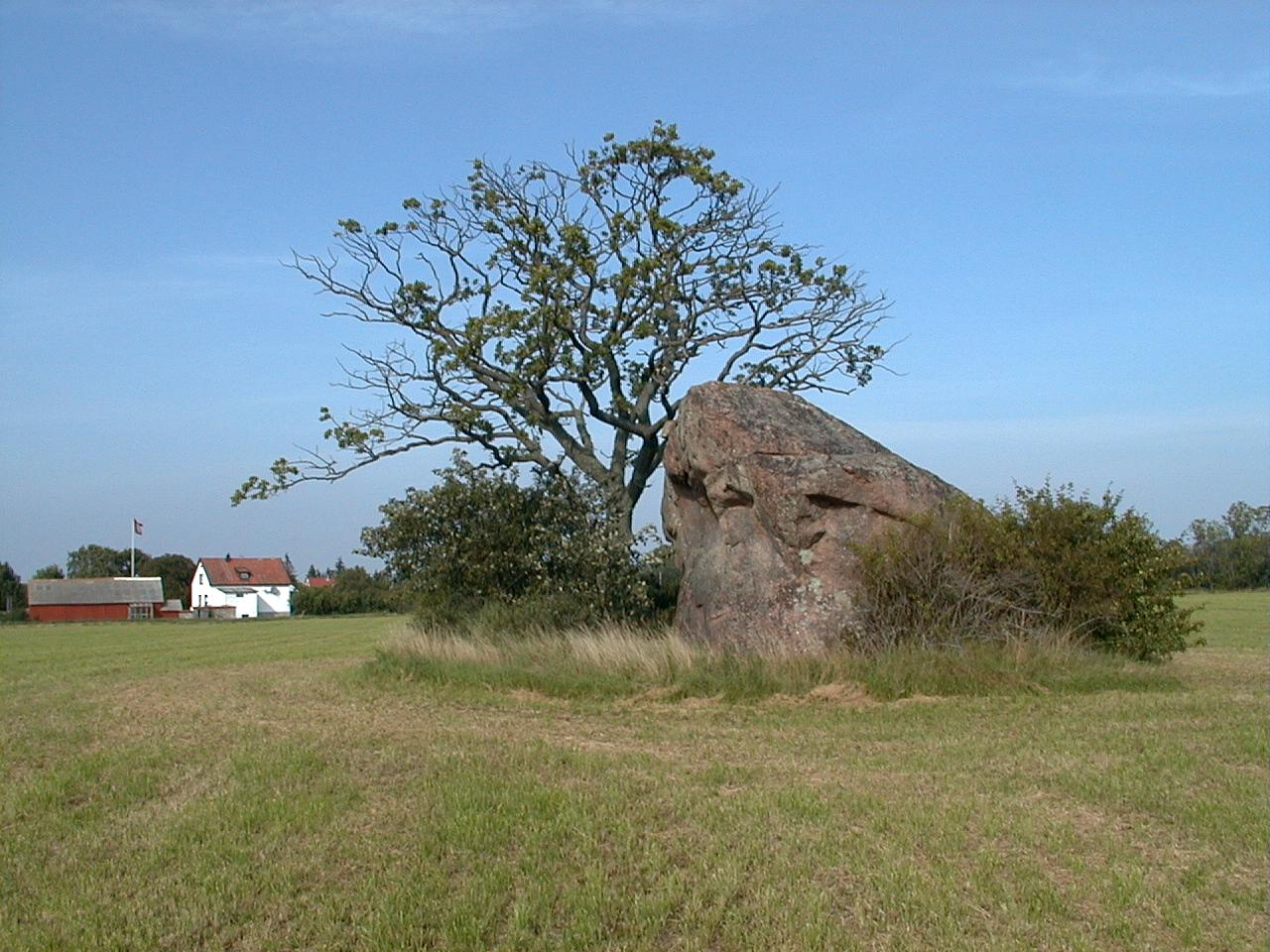
- Hägdarve in Rone

- Location within Gotland
- Coordinates: 57°12′32″N 18°26′28″E
- Country: Sweden
- Province: Gotland
- County: Gotland County
- Municipality: Gotland Municipality

Area
  - Total: 45.6 km^{2} (17.6 sq mi)

Population (2014)
  - Total: 418
- Time zone: UTC+1 (CET)
  - Summer (DST): UTC+2 (CEST)
- Website: www.rone.nu

Rone (Swedish pronunciation: [ˈrûːnɛ]) is a populated area, a socken (not to be confused with parish), on the Swedish island of Gotland. It comprises the same area as the administrative Rone District, established on 1 January 2016.

== Geography ==
Rone is the name of the socken as well as the district. It is also the name of the small village surrounding the medieval Rone Church, sometimes referred to as Rone kyrkby. It is situated in the southeast part of Gotland. The village and harbor Ronehamn is on the southeast coast of Rone.

As of 2019, Rone Church belongs to Alva-Hemse-Rone parish in Sudrets pastorat, along with the churches in Alva and Hemse.

One of the asteroids in the asteroid belt, 8680 Rone, is named after this place.

== History ==
There are several Bronze Age cairns in Rone, including Uggarde rojr, the largest cairn on Gotland. Another one is Lejstu rojr, which is also an area of cairns, walls and grave fields. Two of the asteroids in the asteroid belt, 10807 Uggarde and 10810 Lejsturojr, are named after these cairns.

Rojr, roir and rör are Gutnish words for cairn.
