= Alskog Church =

- Alskogs kyrka
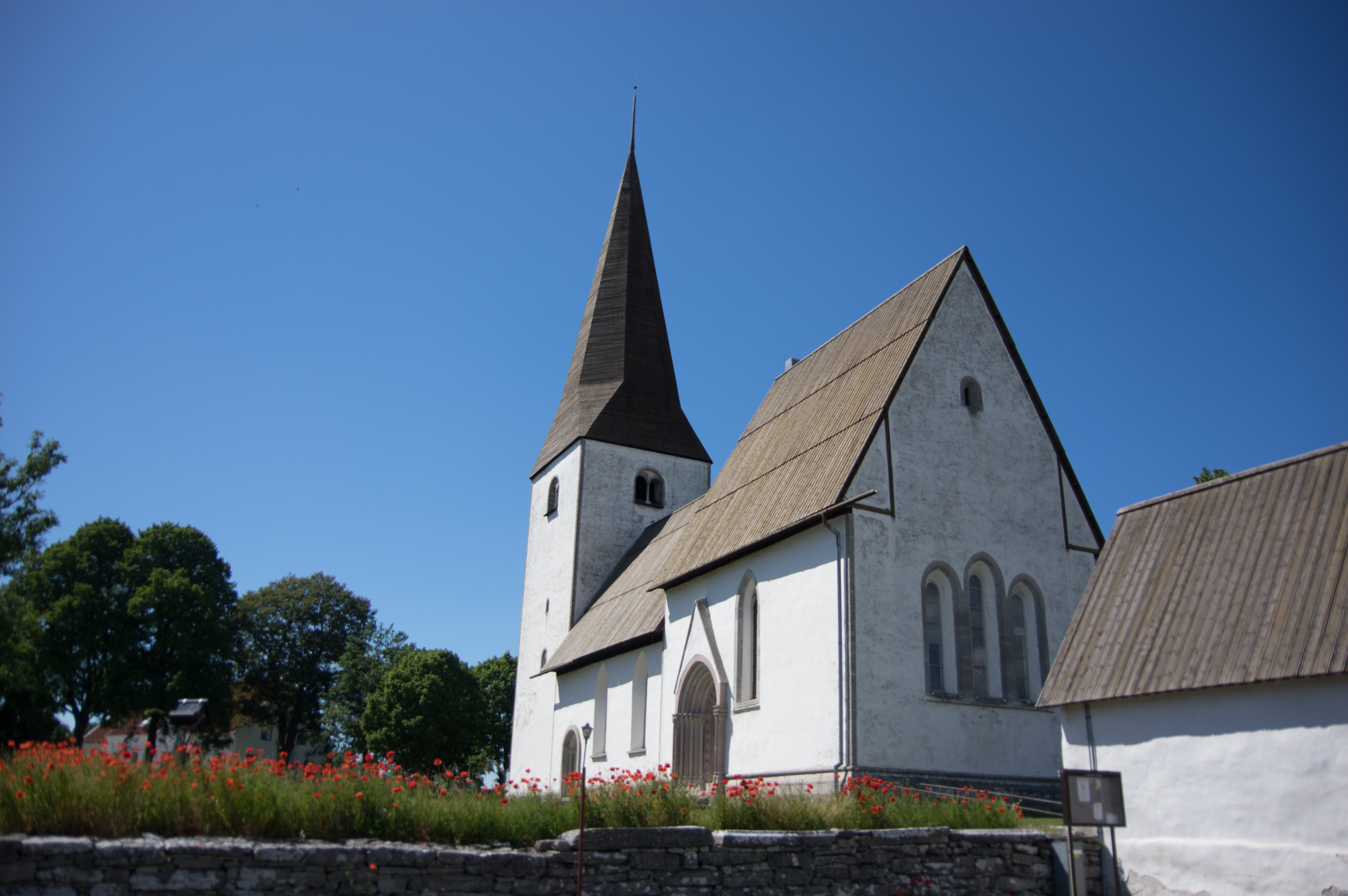
- Alskog Church, view of the exterior

- Location on Gotland
- 57°19′53″N 18°37′38″E
- Country: Sweden
- Denomination: Church of Sweden
- Previous denomination: Catholic

Administration
- Diocese: Visby

Alskog Church (Swedish: Alskogs kyrka) is a medieval church in Alskog on the Swedish island of Gotland. The church in its entirety dates from the 13th century, with the last additions probably being made c. 1300. A few alterations are of later date. It contains several medieval furnishings, as well as some medieval stained glass windows. Alskog Church belongs to the Church of Sweden and lies in the Diocese of Visby.

== History and architecture ==
The oldest part of the church is the nave, dating from the first quarter of the 13th century. It displays an unusual southern portal, decorated with sculptures. Inside, the nave is divided in two parts by two central columns and has a vaulted ceiling. The tower is somewhat later but also from the early 13th century. Its portal show similarities with the tower portal of Visby Cathedral. The much larger choir and vestry were added circa 1300. The ambition was probably to rebuild the whole church into a larger, Gothic church, but for some reason only the eastern part of the church was rebuilt.

Few alterations have been made since the Middle Ages. During the 19th century, some windows were added and new pews installed. The church underwent a renovation in 1964–1965 following a proposal by architect Karl Erik Hjalmarson.

Of the furnishings, the triumphal cross, dating from circa 1200 is perhaps the most noteworthy, together with the richly carved baptismal font, complete with substantial traces of original colour, from the same time. A few separate medieval sculptures also survive, originally part of a 14th-century retable. The church windows have several preserved stained glass panes from around 1300, probably when the choir was built. They depict scenes from the life of Jesus. From the time after the Reformation, the pulpit deserves mention. It was made in 1586 and is the oldest pulpit on Gotland. The church also has a pair of embroidered bags for collection of alms made in Istanbul in 1775. They were brought to the church by the priest at the Swedish legation in the city, who was the son of a pastor in Alskog Church.

The church belongs to the Church of Sweden and lies within the Diocese of Visby.
