= Klintehamn =

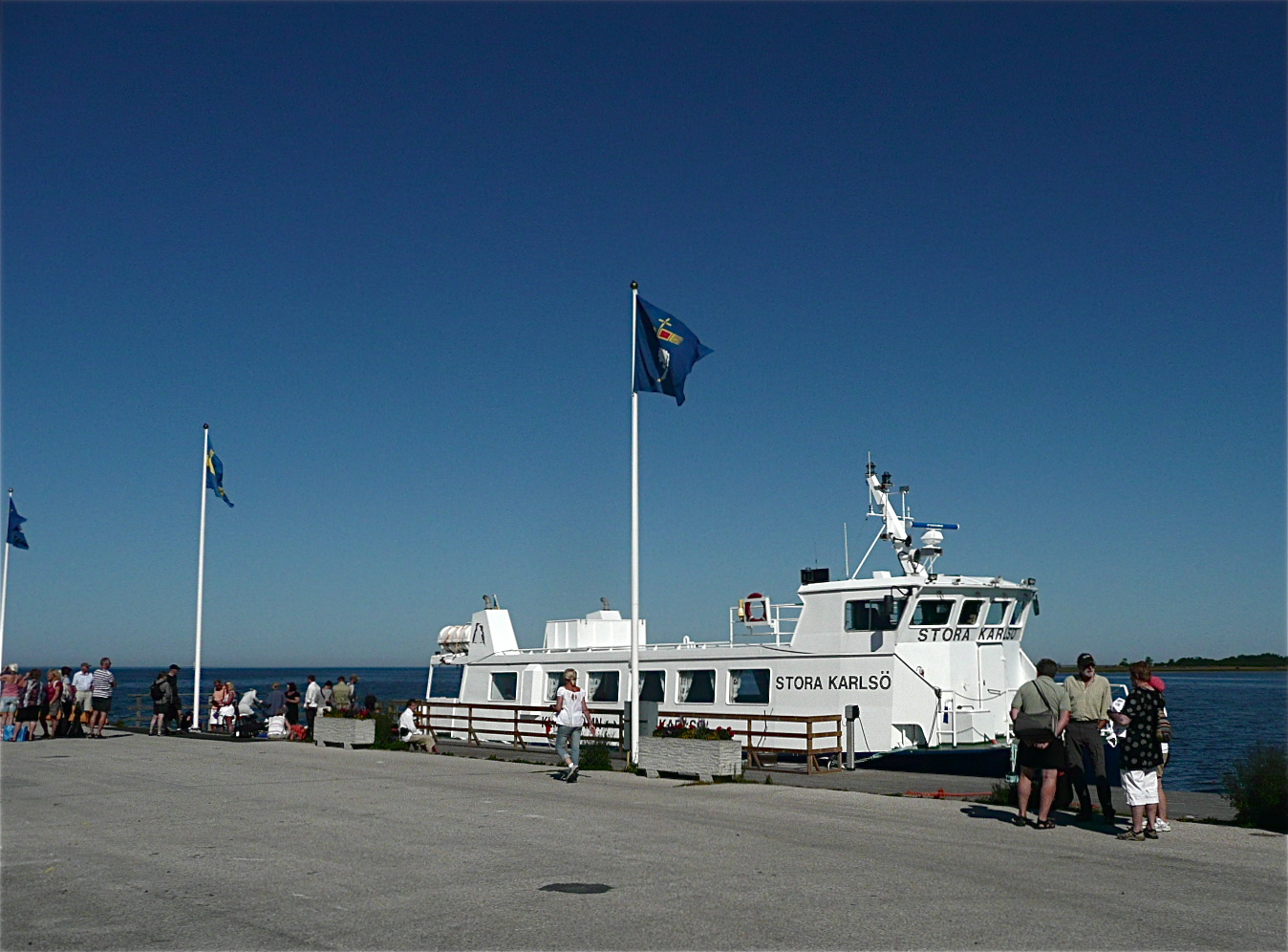
- Boat to Stora Karlsö at Klintehamn harbor

- Location within Gotland
- Coordinates: 57°24′N 18°12′E
- Country: Sweden
- Province: Gotland
- County: Gotland County
- Municipality: Gotland Municipality

Area
  - Total: 2.12 km^{2} (0.82 sq mi)

Population (31 December 2014)
  - Total: 1,350
  - Density: 643/km^{2} (1,670/sq mi)
- Time zone: UTC+1 (CET)
  - Summer (DST): UTC+2 (CEST)

Klintehamn (Swedish pronunciation: [klɪntɛˈhamn]) is a locality in Klinte on the Swedish island of Gotland with 1,350 inhabitants in 2010.

== Transportation ==
Klintehamn is a shipping port on the west coast of Gotland where timber and agricultural products are shipped to mainland Sweden. The harbor also has a marina for small boats. During summer, ferries depart daily from the harbor to Stora Karlsö island.

In 1897, a railway was built from Klintehamn to Romakloster for transporting sugar beets to the sugar refinery in Roma.

== Events ==
Since the first half of the 19th century, the annual Klinte Market is one of the major autumn markets on Gotland. There are five official markets held on the island in August–October: Slite, Havdhem, Kräklingbo, Klintehamn and Hemse, each usually spanning a weekend.
