= Hemse =

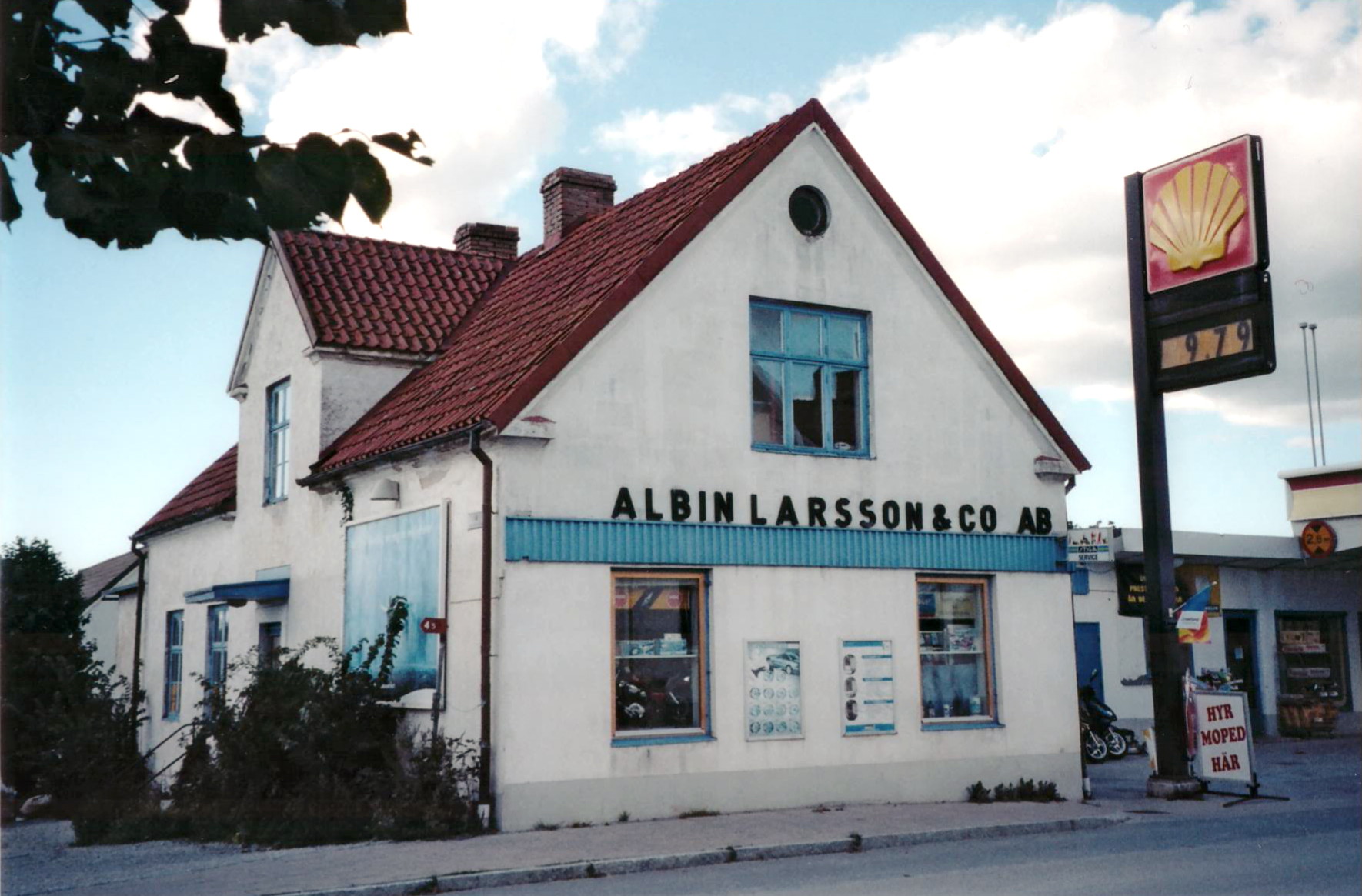
- Hemse main street

- Location within Gotland
- Coordinates: 57°14′N 18°22′E
- Country: Sweden
- Province: Gotland
- County: Gotland County
- Municipality: Gotland Municipality

Area
  - Total: 2.11 km^{2} (0.81 sq mi)

Population (31 December 2014)
  - Total: 1,700
  - Density: 814/km^{2} (2,110/sq mi)
- Time zone: UTC+1 (CET)
  - Summer (DST): UTC+2 (CEST)
- Website: www.hemse.com

Hemse is a locality situated on the Swedish island of Gotland with 1,700 inhabitants in 2014. It is the second largest locality (after Visby) on the island. Hemse is the main center of population in the southern part of the island, and it is known for its markets.

Hemse is also the name of the larger populated area, socken (not to be confused with parish). It comprises the same area as the administrative Hemse District, established on 1 January 2016.

== Geography ==
Hemse is the name of the locality surrounding the medieval Hemse Church, sometimes referred to as Hemse kyrkby. It is also the name of the socken as well as the district. Hemse is situated in the central part of southern Gotland. As of 2019, Hemse Church belongs to Alva-Hemse-Rone parish in Sudrets pastorat, along with the churches in Alva and Rone.

One of the asteroids in the asteroid belt, 10124 Hemse, is named after this place.

== History ==
Hemse Stave Church, the best-preserved remnants of a stave church from present-day Sweden, was discovered under the floor of Hemse Church during the late 19th century.

== Events ==
The annual Hemse Market is one of the major autumn markets on Gotland. There are five official markets held on the island in August–October: Slite, Havdhem, Kräklingbo, Klintehamn and Hemse, each usually spanning a weekend.

== Sports ==
The following sports clubs are located in Hemse:

- Fardhem IF

== Climate ==
Hemse has a maritime climate partially influenced by being on an offshore island but also its interior position on Gotland. As a result, it has features both reminiscent of mainland southern Sweden and of coastal Gotland. It has the warmest summer days and coldest winter nights out of the active Gotland stations. It is also both rainier and snowier than coastal areas. Even so, seasonal lag is still strong which results in spring getting frequent cold snaps. With the coastal parts of Gotland being the sunniest part of the Nordics and Baltics, clear nights are frequent also inland. This results in high diurnal temperature variation by Swedish maritime standards.

Climate data for Hemse (2002–2020 averages, extremes since 1945)
Month	Jan	Feb	Mar	Apr	May	Jun	Jul	Aug	Sep	Oct	Nov	Dec	Year
Record high °C (°F)	8.5 (47.3)	12.1 (53.8)	17.9 (64.2)	25.4 (77.7)	28.7 (83.7)	30.9 (87.6)	33.7 (92.7)	35.0 (95.0)	29.0 (84.2)	21.0 (69.8)	14.6 (58.3)	10.2 (50.4)	35.0 (95.0)
Mean maximum °C (°F)	6.1 (43.0)	7.2 (45.0)	12.6 (54.7)	18.5 (65.3)	23.6 (74.5)	26.2 (79.2)	28.2 (82.8)	27.4 (81.3)	22.6 (72.7)	16.9 (62.4)	11.7 (53.1)	7.6 (45.7)	29.4 (84.9)
Mean daily maximum °C (°F)	1.8 (35.2)	2.3 (36.1)	5.5 (41.9)	11.3 (52.3)	16.5 (61.7)	20.4 (68.7)	22.7 (72.9)	22.1 (71.8)	17.7 (63.9)	11.4 (52.5)	6.9 (44.4)	3.7 (38.7)	11.9 (53.3)
Daily mean °C (°F)	−0.6 (30.9)	−0.4 (31.3)	1.5 (34.7)	5.9 (42.6)	10.7 (51.3)	14.8 (58.6)	17.6 (63.7)	17.0 (62.6)	13.1 (55.6)	7.9 (46.2)	4.5 (40.1)	1.6 (34.9)	7.8 (46.0)
Mean daily minimum °C (°F)	−3.0 (26.6)	−3.0 (26.6)	−2.6 (27.3)	0.5 (32.9)	4.8 (40.6)	9.1 (48.4)	12.4 (54.3)	11.9 (53.4)	8.5 (47.3)	4.3 (39.7)	2.1 (35.8)	−0.6 (30.9)	3.7 (38.7)
Mean minimum °C (°F)	−13.6 (7.5)	−11.9 (10.6)	−11.1 (12.0)	−5.9 (21.4)	−2.4 (27.7)	2.0 (35.6)	6.7 (44.1)	4.9 (40.8)	1.1 (34.0)	−3.3 (26.1)	−5.8 (21.6)	−8.6 (16.5)	−15.8 (3.6)
Record low °C (°F)	−24.8 (−12.6)	−25.7 (−14.3)	−22.6 (−8.7)	−10.8 (12.6)	−7.0 (19.4)	−1.4 (29.5)	2.8 (37.0)	0.3 (32.5)	−6.8 (19.8)	−9.4 (15.1)	−15.1 (4.8)	−22.0 (−7.6)	−25.7 (−14.3)
Average precipitation mm (inches)	55.6 (2.19)	40.2 (1.58)	34.2 (1.35)	24.5 (0.96)	25.7 (1.01)	40.6 (1.60)	72.2 (2.84)	70.8 (2.79)	48.2 (1.90)	61.8 (2.43)	68.4 (2.69)	66.6 (2.62)	608.8 (23.96)
Source 1: SMHI
Source 2: SMHI
