= Dalhem Church =

- Dalhem kyrka
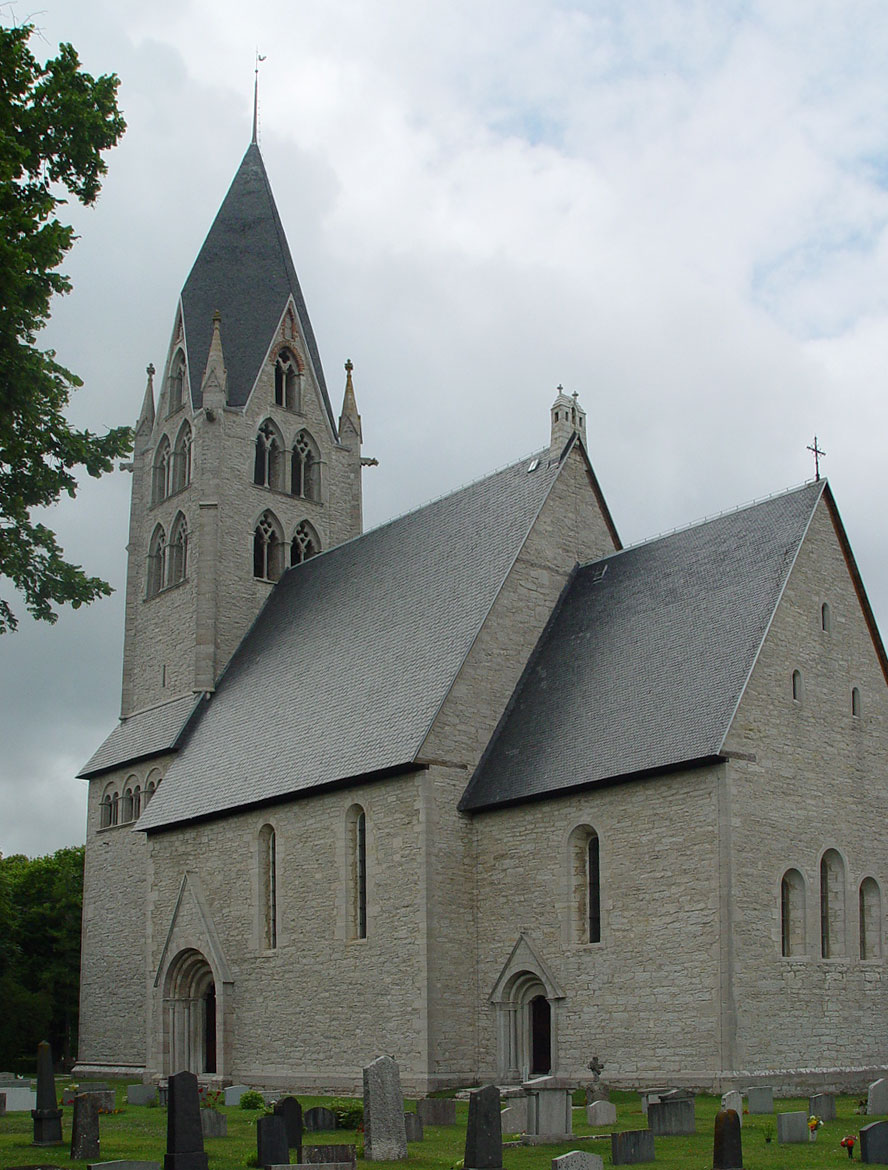
- Dalhem Church, view of the exterior

- Location on Gotland
- 57°33′09″N 18°32′03″E
- Country: Sweden
- Denomination: Church of Sweden

Administration
- Diocese: Visby

Dalhem Church (Swedish: Dalhems kyrka) is a medieval church in Dalhem on the Swedish island of Gotland. Built in the 13th and 14th century, the church underwent major changes during a renovation at the turn of the 19th–20th centuries. Dalhem Church lies in the Diocese of Visby of the Church of Sweden.

== History ==
The very first church on the site was a stave church, now vanished. This was followed by small stone church on the same site. This church, probably Romanesque in style, seems to have had a choir with an apse. In the presently visible church, the choir and nave are the oldest parts, dating from the 13th century. The tower, the main portal and the large window on the western façade date from the 14th century. The construction was led by Cistercian monks from nearby Roma Abbey. The church was subsequently left more or less unchanged, with only some furnishings – notably, the carved wooden pulpit (1637) – being added later. In 1899 a major renovation of the church started, which to a large degree transformed the church.

== Renovation ==
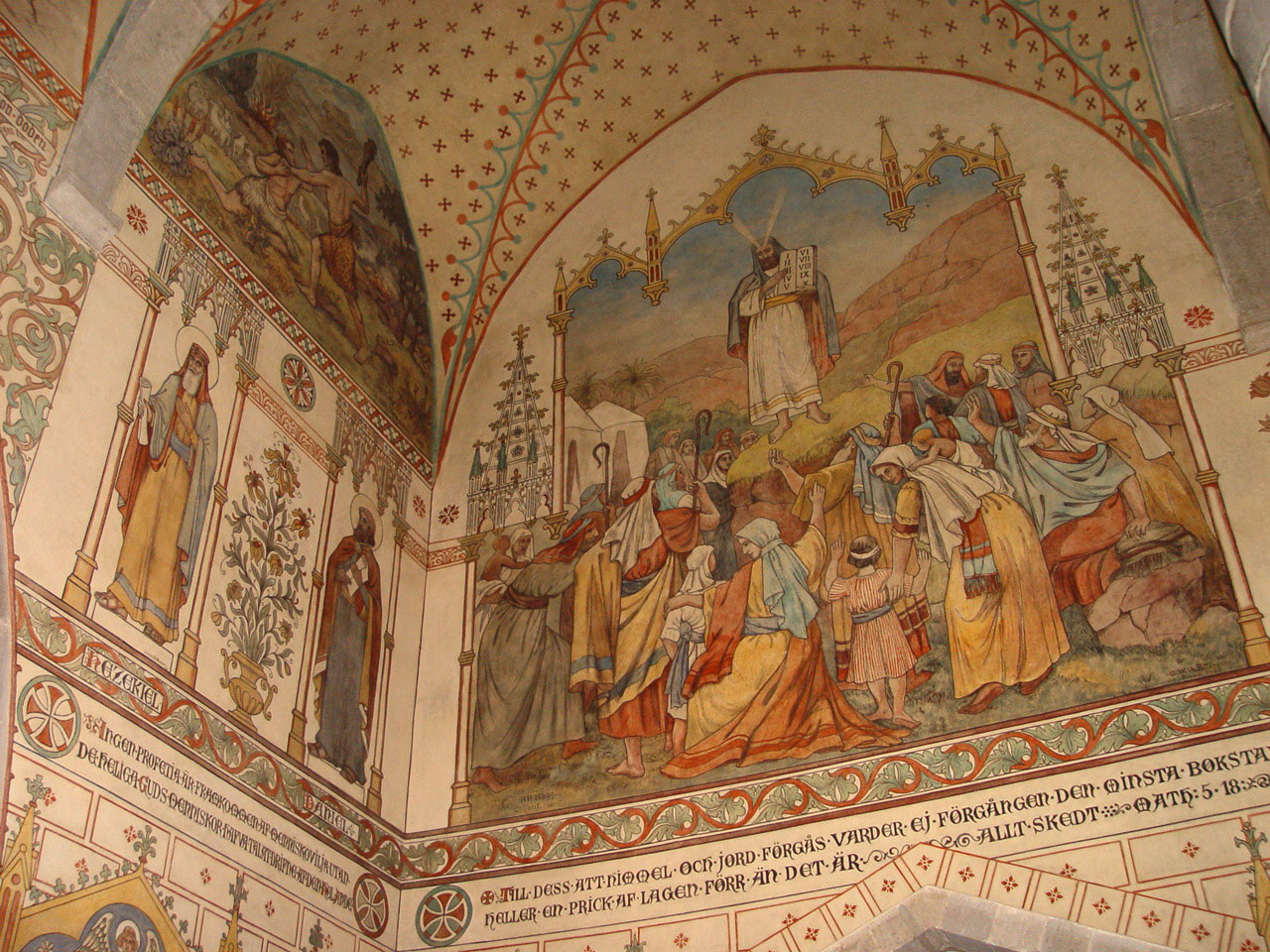
A corner of the interior, showing parts of the murals painted in 1899–1914.

In 1899 a renovation of the church began. Architect and artist Axel Haig (known in Sweden as Axel Herman Hägg, 1835–1921) collected money, also internationally, for the thorough undertaking. The work continued for fifteen years, until 1914. The church was substantially altered both externally and internally, in an attempt to make the church appear even more medieval. The renovation was considered remarkable at the time, and led to the church being called the "national shrine of Gotland". Today, the renovation has been described instead as a "harsh and loose reconstruction of the Middle Ages". It remains a clear example of the ideas of cultural heritage conservation prevalent at the time.

== Architecture ==
The church consists of three distinct parts: the tower, nave and choir. The tower, which reaches over 50 metres (160 ft) is adorned with galleries, an influence of art from the Rhine valley and topped with a form of spire known as a Rhenish helm. The main portal, on the south façade, is decorated with carved stone sculptures with motifs unusual for Gotland (14th century). In the wall adjacent to the northern portal, a tombstone originating from the earlier stone church has been immured. The exterior of the church has been whitewashed but the underlying limestone was laid bare during the 1899–1914 renovation.

Inside, the church is completely dominated by the changes made in 1899–1914, but among the later additions there are several original, medieval details. The church for example has the oldest preserved stained glass windows on Gotland (made by a German artisan), but to these have been added complementing windows in medieval style during the 1899–1914 renovation. Several medieval murals also survive, depicting e.g. the crucifixion and the archangel Michael. The walls are however dominated by the many paintings made by Haig during the renovation. A niche intended to house the bread and wine of the Eucharist, is actually a surviving fragment from the earlier, Romanesque church. The church also has a processional cross from the 14th century and a baptismal font from the 12th century, but almost all of the other furnishings stem from the great renovation of the church.

A minor renovation was carried out again in 1969, and it was then decided that the church should be kept in the condition it was after the 1899–1914 renovation.
