= Gotland National Conscription =

- Gotlands nationalbeväring
- Active: 1811–1887
- Country: Sweden
- Allegiance: Swedish Armed Forces
- Branch: Swedish Army
- Type: Infantry
- Garrison/HQ: Visby

Insignia
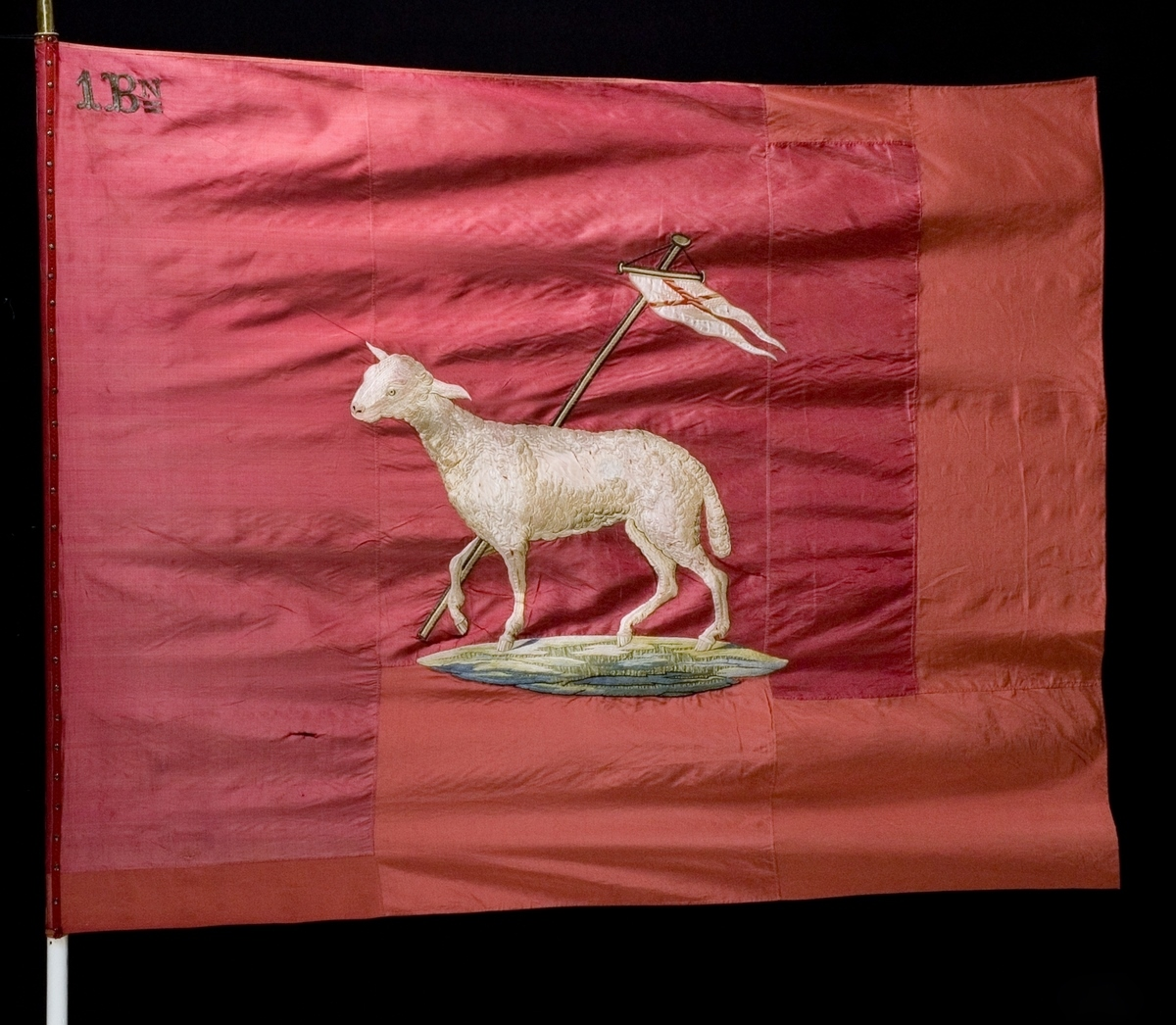
- Battalion colour m/1849

The Gotland National Conscription (Swedish: Gotlands nationalbeväring) was a Swedish Army infantry unit that traced its origins back to the 19th century. It was split into two new regiments in 1887. The regiment's soldiers were recruited on the island of Gotland.

== History ==
Gotland National Conscription was raised in 1811 through an agreement, a convention between the people of Gotland and the king. It became Sweden's first military conscript defence with exercise duty even in peacetime. It mobilized nearly 20% of the population and raised four battalions in addition to artillery. The officers were appointed by the King; non-commissioned officers were elected by the men. In 1887, the Gotland National Conscription was reformed into two separate units, the Gotland Infantry Regiment and the Gotland Artillery Corps.

== Organisation 1861 ==
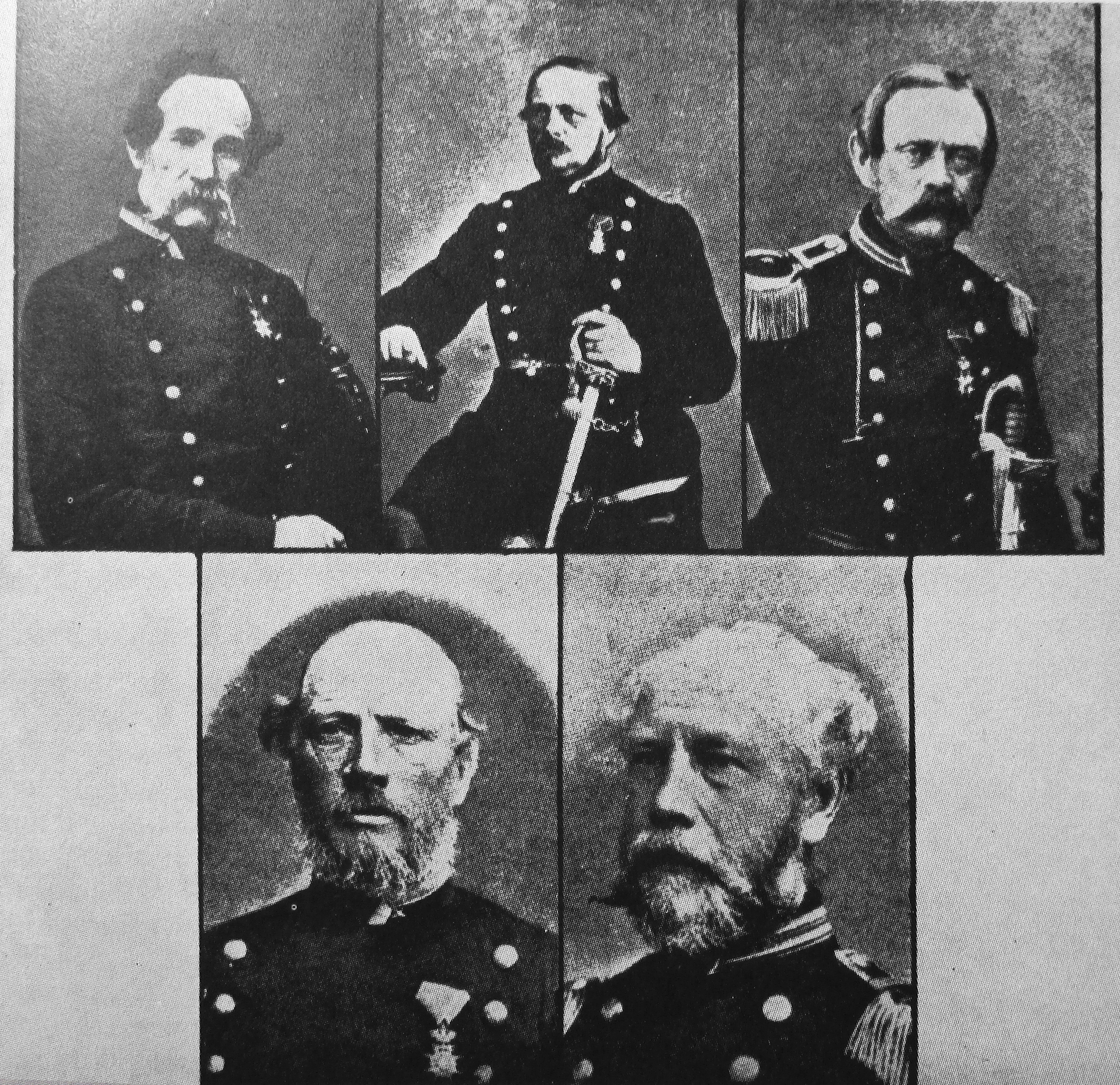
Battalion commanders of the Gotlands nationalbeväring (the Gotland National Conscription), 1880s. Top row, left to right: C. G. Meukow, C. O. A. af Klint and P. A. L. Gahne. Lower row, left to right: O. L. Gustafsson and Ad. v. Post. Gotlands Tidningar (Newspaper), 1887.

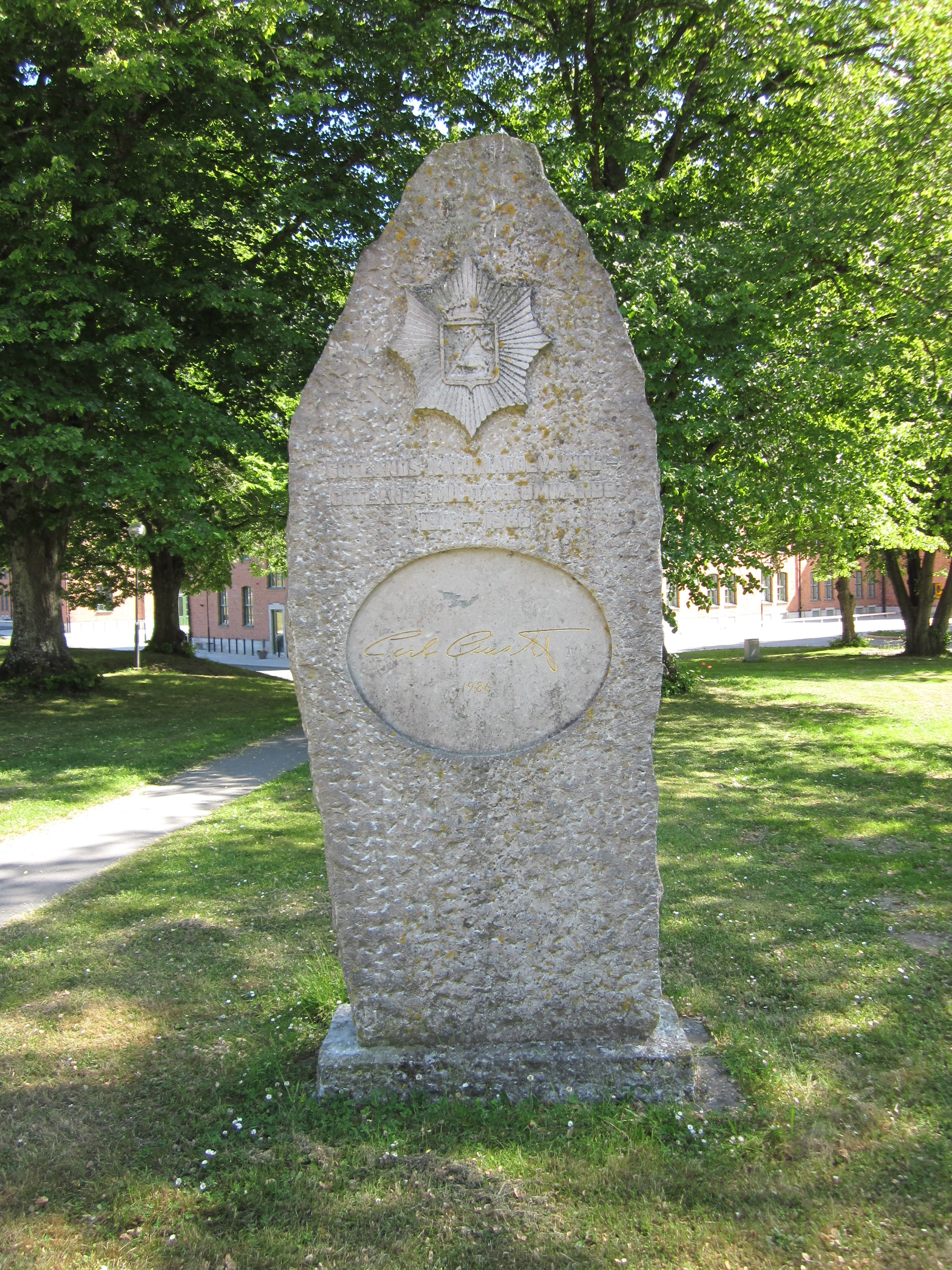
Memorial stone at P 18. The text reads: "Gotland National Conscription - Gotland Military Command 1811-1986."

Northern battalion (which in 1870 consisted of 5,040 men) consisted of the following companies:

- Fårö company: Fårö socken
- Rute company: Rute, Fleringe and Bunge socken
- Forsa company: Lärbro, Hellvi and Tingstäde
- Bals company: Othem, Boge, Hejnum and Bäl
- Lina company: Hörsne, Bara, Gothem and Norrlanda
- Stenkyrka company: Stenkyrka, Hangvar and Hall
- Lummelunds company: Martebo, Lummelunda and Väskinde
- Halla kompani: Dalhem, Ganthem and Halla

Visby battalion (which in 1870 consisted of 1,690 men) consisted of the following companies:

- Visby jäger company
- Visby infantry company
- Endre company: Endre, Hejdeby, Barlingbo and Ekeby
- Dede company: Roma, Björke, Follingbo and Akebäck
- Bro company: Bro, Fole, Lokrume, Källunge and Vallstena
- Stenkumla company: Stenkumla, Västerhejde, Träkumla, Vall and Hogrän
- Eskelhems company: Eskelhem and Tofta

Middle battalion (which in 1870 consisted of 1,730 men) consisted of the following companies:

- Sanda (Banda) company: Sanda, Västergarn and Mästerby
- Klinte company: Klinte and Fröjel
- Hejde company: Hejde, Väte and Atlingbo
- Sjonhems company: Sjonhem, Viklau, Vänge, Buttle and Guldrupe
- Östergarns company: Östergarn, Gammelgarn and Ardre
- Thorsburgs company: Kräklingbo, Ala and Anga
- Garda company: Garda, Etelhem, Alskog and Lye

Southern battalion (which in 1870 consisted of 2,350 men) consisted of the following companies:

- Närs kompani: När and Lau
- Burs kompani: Burs and Stånga
- Fardhems kompani: Fardhem, Linde, Lojsta, Levide and Gerum
- Hablingbo kompani: Hablingbo, Silte, Eksta and Sproge
- Hemse kompani: Alva, Hemse, Rone and Eke
- Havdhems kompani: Havdhem and Näs
- Gröttlinge kompani: Grötlingbo and Fide
- Hoburgs kompani: Öja, Hamra, Vamlingbo and Sundre

The number of conscripts amounted to 8,496 men and the officer corps comprised 111 men. The state cost for the conscripts amounted to 139,562 riksdaler and 92 öre, of which the military accounted for 2,000.

== Commanding officers ==
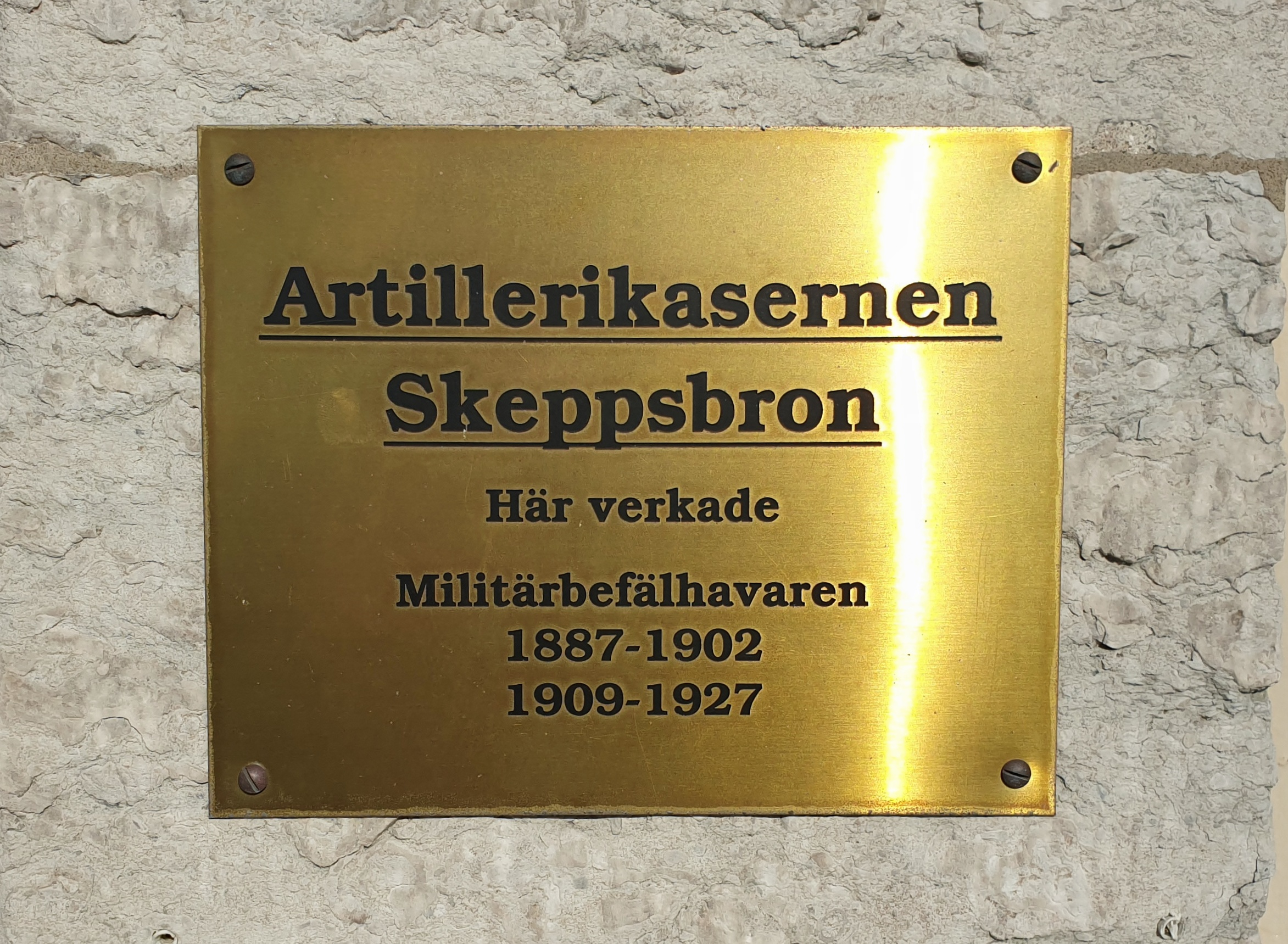
"Artillery Barracks Skeppsbron Here worked the Military Commander 1887–1902 1909–1927"

The Military Commanders of Gotland from 1811 to 1886. After Lennart Reuterskiöld's withdrawal as military commander the post of Military Commander and County Governor came to be united until 1873, then the posts were separated into two. Both Rudolf Cederström and Lennart Reuterskiöld were Military Commander and Deputy County Governor.

- 1810-08-22 – 1811-11-03: Rudolf Cederström
- 1811-11-03 – 1812-08-31: Lennart Reuterskiöld
- 1812-08-31 – 1817-03-26: Carl Fredric Aschling
- 1817-03-26 – 1831-06-30: Jacob Cederström
- 1831-06-30 – 1849-11-23: Michael Silvius von Hohenhausen
- 1849-11-23 – 1858-07-17: Gustaf Jacob af Dalström
- 1858-07-17 – 1862-05-13: Gillis Bildt
- 1862-05-13 – 1873-09-20: Henrik Gyllenram
- 1873-09-20 – 1884-04-09: Ernst von Vegesack
- 1884-04-09 – 1895-07-29: Herman von Hohenhausen (Note: When Gotland National Conscription was reorganized in 1886 von Hohenhausen became the commanding officer of Gotland Infantry Regiment (I 18).)

== See also ==
- List of Swedish regiments
