= Bjørke Church =

Bjørke Church may refer to:

- Bjørke Church (Nannestad), a historic church in Nannestad Municipality, Akershus county, Norway
- Bjørke Church (Volda), a church in Volda Municipality, Møre og Romsdal county, Norway

== See also ==
- Björke Church, a church in Björke on the Swedish island of Gotland
