= Bäl Church =

- Bäl kyrka
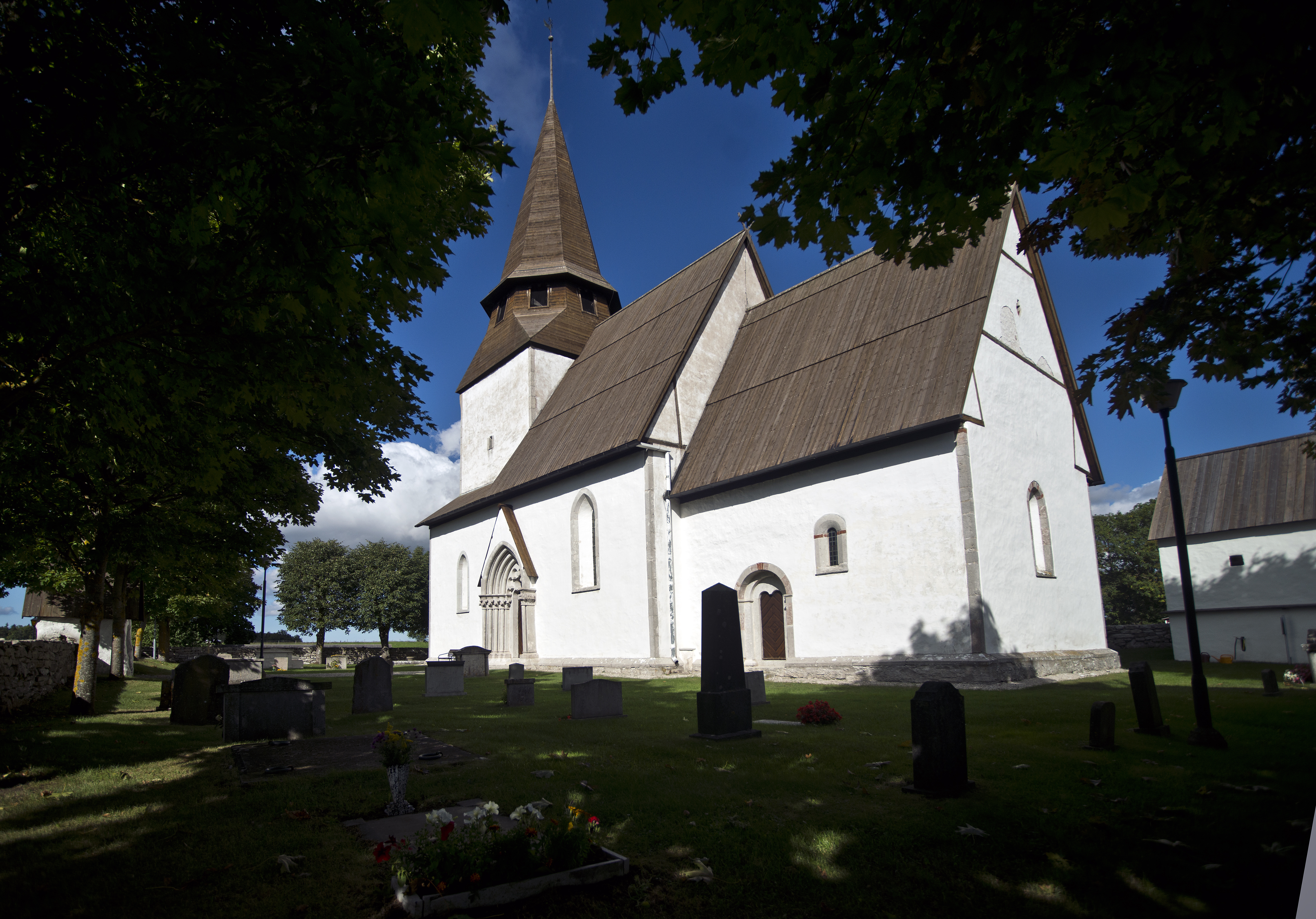
- Bäl Church, view of the exterior

- Location on Gotland
- 57°38′41″N 18°37′58″E
- Country: Sweden
- Denomination: Church of Sweden

Administration
- Diocese: Visby

Bäl Church (Swedish: Bäl kyrka) is a medieval church in Gute, Bäl, on the Swedish island of Gotland. It was built during the first half of the 13th century and contains sculptural decoration in both Romanesque and Gothic styles. The interior is decorated by medieval wall paintings. It belongs to the parish of Väskinde, in the Diocese of Visby.

== History and architecture ==
The current church was built during the first half of the 13th century and replaced an earlier stone church on the same site, fragments of which still remain in the wall between the choir and nave. Of the presently visible church, the choir is the oldest part, with the nave and tower being built successively. Paintings were added in the 13th century through 15th centuries. For some reason, the tower was never finished and does not reach its originally intended height.

The church has two portals on the western façade, one leading to the choir, and a larger main portal, located on the south side of the nave. The smaller one is the oldest and still Romanesque in style, while the main portal is Gothic, and more elaborate. Additionally, there is an entrance on the north façade. The window openings are all original, and have not been enlarged during later centuries.

Inside, the church is decorated by medieval murals, uncovered in the early 21st century. They depict the Passion of Christ and scenes from the Bible. The church has some medieval items: a triumphal cross (late 13th century), a baptismal font (13th century), and a wooden sculpture depicting Mary. The altarpiece is Baroque, executed in 1664, and the pulpit is from 1744.

The church was renovated in 1965–66, and again in the early 2000s (decade).

Bäl Church lies in the parish Väskinde, in the Diocese of Visby. It is used by the Church of Sweden.
