= Ernst von Vegesack =

Swedish Army officer, Union volunteer and politician

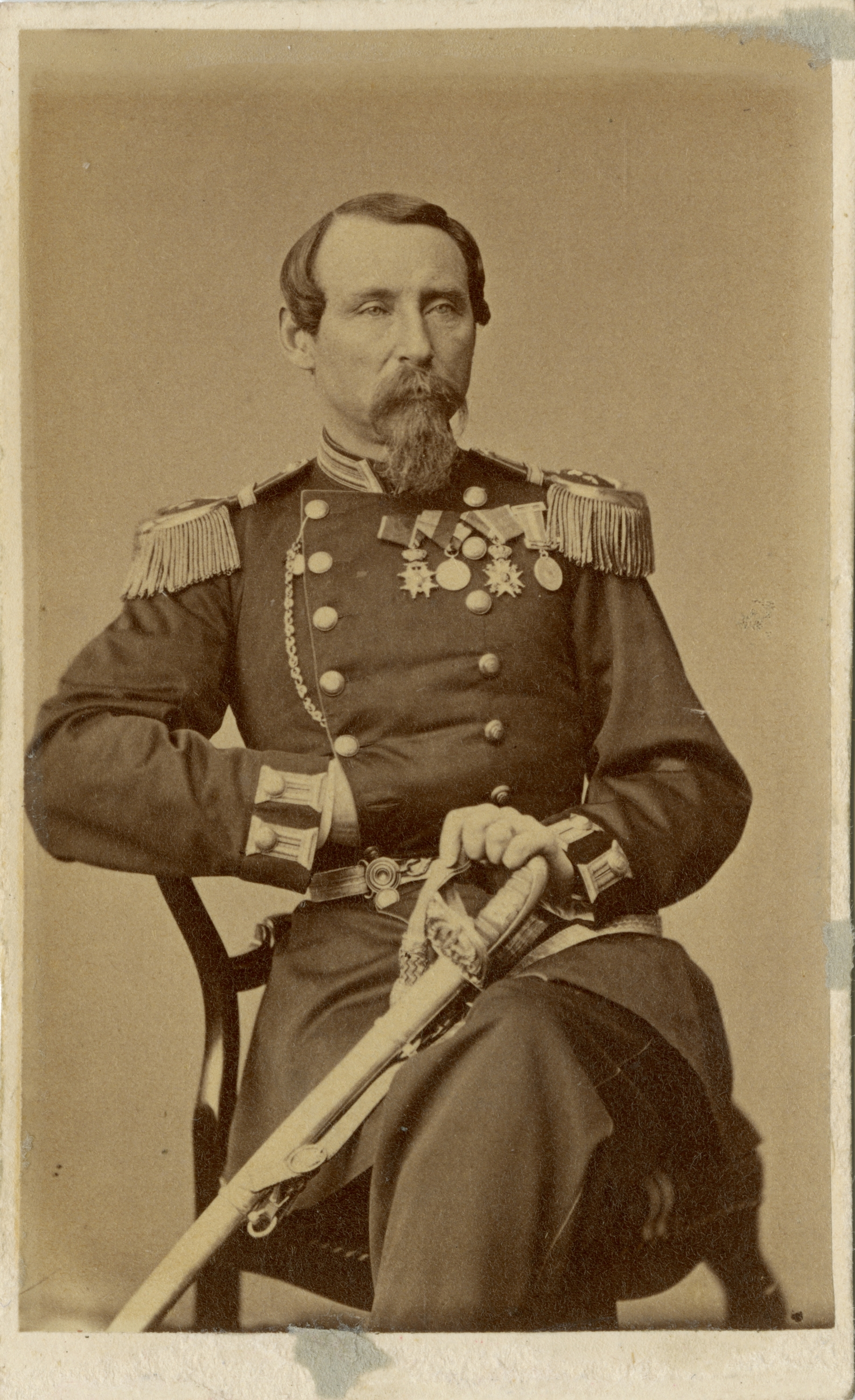
- Portrait by August Roesler, c. 1864–75
- Born: Ernst Mathias Peter von Vegesack; June 18, 1820; Hemse, Sweden
- Died: January 12, 1903 (aged 82); Stockholm, Sweden
- Burial place: Norra begravningsplatsen, Sweden
- Military career
- Allegiance: Sweden; United States
- Branch: Swedish Army; United States Army; Union Army
- Service years: 1840–1861, 1864–1888 (Sweden); 1861–1863 (USA)
- Rank: Major General (Sweden); Colonel (USA); Brevet Brigadier General
- Commands: 20th New York Infantry Regiment; Västerbotten Field Jäger Regiment; Hälsinge Regiment; Gotland National Conscription
- Conflicts: American Civil War: Battle of Gaines's Mill
- Awards: Medal of Honor; För tapperhet i fält

Ernst Mathias Peter von Vegesack (June 18, 1820 – January 12, 1903) was a Swedish Army officer and volunteer in the Union Army during American Civil War and later on was a member of the parliament of Sweden. After his return to Sweden, he was awarded the brevet grade of Brigadier general of volunteers and in 1893 he received the Medal of Honor for bravery in the Battle of Gaines's Mill.

== Career in Sweden ==
Ernst von Vegesack was born in Hemse on the Baltic island of Gotland to customs inspector, captain and Baron Eberhard von Vegesack (1794–1855) and Ulrica Christina Sophie (née Lythberg). In 1840 he became a second lieutenant of Gotland National Conscription. Two years later he was transferred to Dalarna Regiment and was promoted to lieutenant in 1843. He was educated in surveying and became a land surveyor in Kopparbergs County in 1846. He worked until 1850 as a land surveyor and in 1852 he was transferred to Saint Barthélemy, then a Swedish possession in the Caribbean. After his return to Sweden, he was promoted to captain in 1857 and became company commander at Dalarna Regiment and he was also supervising the Gävle-Dala Railroad, the first long railroad of Sweden.

== American Civil War ==
Ernst von Vegesack in 1861.

At the outbreak of the Civil War in 1861, von Vegesack left for the United States and joined the Union Army. He became captain of the 58th Ohio Infantry. The same year, he was promoted to major in the staff of general John E. Wool. First he served in Fort Monroe. As an aide-de-camp (ADC) to Joseph K. Mansfield he took part in the artillery bombardment of Newport News. In 1862 he resigned, but then he joined Major General George B. McClellan in his siege of Yorktown. As an ADC to Butterfield he took part in the battles of Hanover Court House, of Seven Pines and of Fair Oaks. He was at the Battle of Mechanicsville, Gaines's Mill, Savage's Station, and Malvern Hill. Vegesack was appointed colonel of the 20th New York Infantry, the German "Turner" regiment. He was given the command over the 3rd brigade in General William Farrar Smith's division of the 6th Army Corps. He took part in the Second Battle of Bull Run. He captured the heights outside Jefferson, Maryland. He displayed bravery at Antietam. Vegesack was in the Battle of Fredericksburg. In May 1863 Vegesack's regiment was a part of Joseph Hooker's left wing in the Battle of Chancellorsville.

Vegesack resigned from the Union Army on June 1, 1863, and returned to Sweden. On February 22, 1866, President Andrew Johnson nominated von Vegesack for award of the brevet grade of brigadier general of volunteers, to rank from March 13, 1865, and the United States Senate confirmed the appointment on April 10, 1866.

For his service in the Union army, and for repeated acts of courage he was given Sweden's highest medal for bravery, the För tapperhet i fält (For valour in the field) in gold upon his return to Sweden.

== Back in Sweden ==
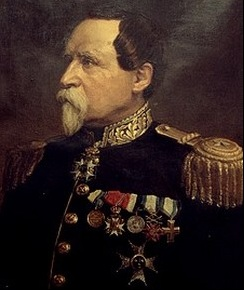
Vegesack as a Swedish major general

After his return to Sweden, Vegesack was promoted to lieutenant colonel and given the command over Västerbotten Field Jäger Corps in 1864. In 1868 he was promoted to colonel and was appointed commander of Hälsinge Regiment. From 1874 till 1884 he was military commander of his native Gotland and commander of Gotland National Conscription (acting in 1873). Promoted to major general in 1884, he was appointed commander of Sweden's 5th Military District. Vegesack resigned from the military in 1888.

From 1878 till 1887 Vegesack sat in the upper house of the parliament of Sweden as a delegate for Gotland. Ernst von Vegesack died January 12, 1903, at Stockholm, and was buried at Norra begravningsplatsen in Stockholm.

== Personal life ==
In 1865, he married Edla Amalia Sergel (1823-1881), the daughter of land owner Johan Gustaf Sergel and Carolina Magdalena (née Dubois).

== Honours and awards ==
- Sweden-Norway: Commander Grand Cross of the Royal Order of the Sword, 1 December 1887

== Medal of Honor citation ==
Medal of Honor

Rank and organization: Major and Aide-de-Camp, U.S. Volunteers. Place and date: At Gaines Mill, Va., 27 June 1862. Entered service at: New York, N.Y. Birth: Sweden. Date of issue: 23 August 1893.

Citation:

While voluntarily serving as aide-de-camp, successfully and advantageously charged the position of troops under fire.

== See also ==
- List of Medal of Honor recipients
