= Hejnum Church =

- Hejnum kyrka
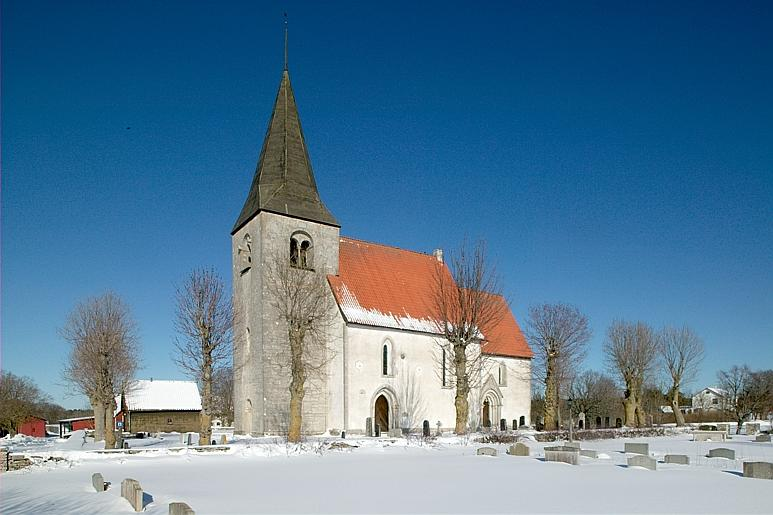
- Hejnum Church, view of the exterior

- Location on Gotland
- 57°40′48″N 18°37′55″E
- Country: Sweden
- Denomination: Church of Sweden

Administration
- Diocese: Visby

Hejnum Church (Swedish: Hejnums kyrka) is a medieval Lutheran church in Hejnum on the island of Gotland, Sweden. The church lies in the Diocese of Visby of the Church of Sweden.

== History ==
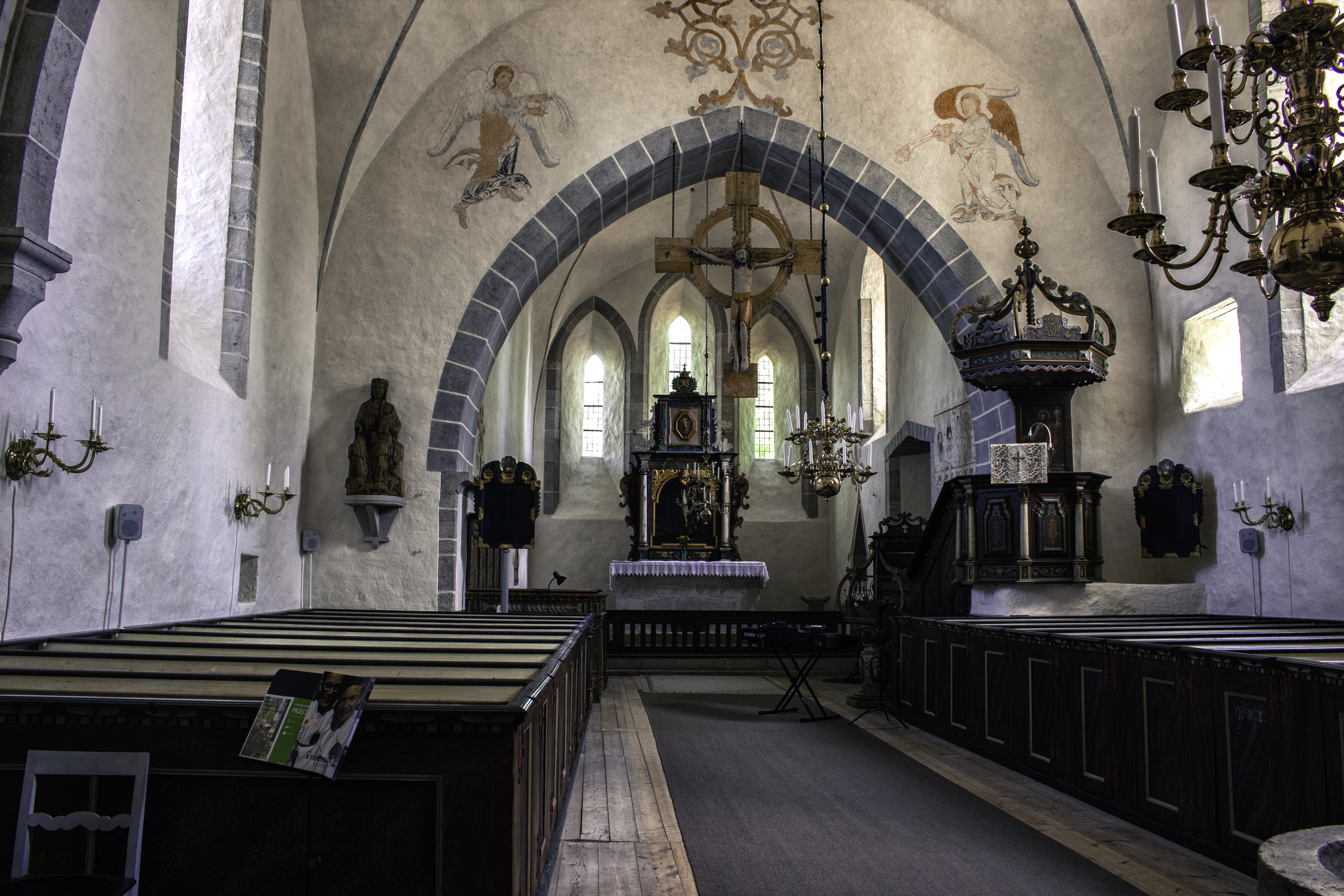
Hejnum Church interior

The Romanesque tower is the oldest part of Hejnum Church. It originally formed part of a Romanesque church, but the nave and choir were replaced during the mid-13th century by the presently visible, more Gothic parts. Remains of the original church were discovered during an excavation in 1914. A runic inscription above the western portal of the tower bears the inscription "Botvid master mason". The church remains largely unchanged since the Middle Ages and underwent a renovation in 1960 under the direction of architect Olle Karth (1905-1965).

The church is the property of the Church of Sweden and part of the Diocese of Visby.

== Architecture ==
The church consists of a nave, a more narrow choir, a sacristy and the western tower. The tower has openings for the church bells supported by colonnettes and an octagonal spire. Several stone reliefs, one portal and parts of a frieze from the original, Romanesque church have been incorporated into the façade of the presently visible church. The main portal of the church is unusually located on the north side of the church, since the church is located south of the road. The lancet-shaped windows, including the three slender windows in the east wall of the choir, are all original. The choir portal has decoration similar to that of Hellvi Church and has been attributed to a stonemason named Lavrans Botvidarsson.

Internally, the church is decorated by murals; one set dating from circa 1250 and another, by the so-called Master of the Passion of Christ (Passionsmästaren), from the 15th century. There are two baptismal font in the church; one from the 13th century, the other is baroque and from 17th century. A crucifix with a ring cross hangs in the triumphal arch and is dated to around 1250. The pulpit dates to 1704. The altarpiece was added in 1738.
