= Väskinde Church =

- Väskinde kyrka
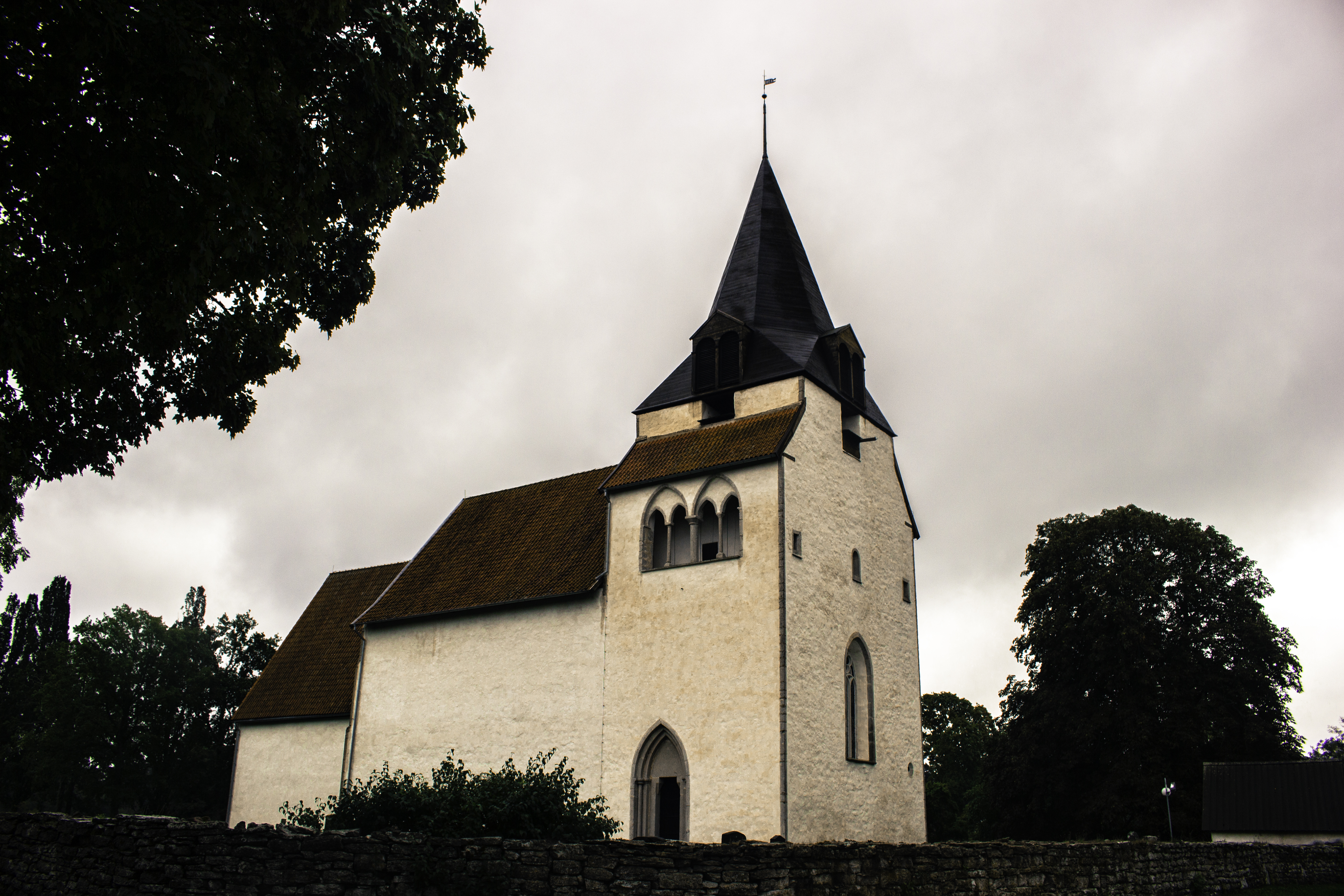
- Väskinde Church, view of the exterior

- Location within Gotland
- 57°41′26″N 18°25′22″E
- Country: Sweden
- Denomination: Church of Sweden

Administration
- Diocese: Visby

Väskinde Church (Swedish: Väskinde kyrka) is a medieval Lutheran church in Väskinde on the island of Gotland, Sweden. It belongs to the Diocese of Visby.

== History ==
The building of the oldest part of the church, the choir, started slightly after 1250, followed by the nave and church tower in circa 1280. The church has remained largely unaltered since the Middle Ages. A renovation was carried out in 1953.

== Architecture ==
The church is Gothic in style. Noteworthy is the southern, sculptured portal of the choir. Its rich ornamentation is unusual for Gotland and seems to reflect an influence from Westphalian churches. Väskinde Church also houses some notable fittings. The baptismal font dates from the 12th century by the sculptor Master Majestatis. The triumphal cross is from about 1240 and the church also houses some medieval wooden sculptures of saints and a church tabernacle. During the 1953 renovation, picture stones from the 5th and 8th centuries were discovered in the vicinity of the church, as were some medieval tombstones, now displayed inside the church.
