= Gustaf Jacob af Dalström =

Swedish military officer and civil servant

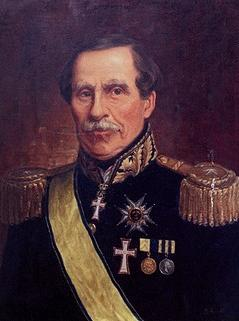
- Dalström in his full dress uniform with his awards

Governor of Gotland County
- In office 23 November 1849 – 17 July 1858
- Monarch: Charles XV
- Preceded by: Michael Silvius von Hohenhausen
- Succeeded by: Gillis Bildt

Personal details
- Born: 25 July 1785 Stockholm, Stockholm County, Sweden
- Died: 22 January 1867 (aged 81) Stockholm, Stockholm County, Sweden-Norway
- Relations: The 2nd Earl Kitchener; Sir Walter Kitchener

Military service
- Allegiance: Sweden; Sweden-Norway
- Branch/service: Swedish Army
- Years of service: 1808–1858
- Commands: Älvsborg Regiment; Gotland National Conscription
- Battles/wars: Finnish War: Battle of Lemo; War of the Sixth Coalition: Combat of Roßlau (WIA)

Gustaf Jacob af Dalström was a Swedish military officer and civil servant. He fought during the Finnish War and the War of the Sixth Coalition later in 1849 he became the governor of Gotland.

== Biography ==
Gustaf Jacob af Dalström was the son of the parish priest Erik Dahlström and his wife Christina Julin and married in 1816 to Anna Christina Hållander. He was the father of the military commander Oskar af Dalström.

== Military career ==
Dalström became an ensign in the Upplands Land Guard in 1808, he participated with distinction in the Finnish War and became a lieutenant after the Battle of Lemo on 19 August 1808. In 1813 he was appointed captain of the Älvsborg Regiment and in 1818 became a major in the General Staff colonel in 1831 and promoted to major general in 1848. In the War of the Sixth Coalition Dalström participated as chief of staff in the 4th Brigade and was severely wounded in the Combat of Roßlau. In 1833 Dalström was knighted, and from 1821 to 1836, he served as a major at the Military Academy Karlberg and was a commander of the Älvsborg Regiment from 1836 to 1848. In 1848 he became commander of a brigade of the Swedish observation corps on Funen and in September of the same year the highest commander of the Swedish troops remaining in Denmark. In 1849, Dalström became governor and military commander on Gotland and in 1853–1854 was the highest commander of the troops withdrawn to the protection of neutrality. In 1858 he was dismissed.

== Awards ==
- För tapperhet i fält, September 29, 1813 (Promoted to Commander on October 14, 1844, and granted Grand Cross on December 18, 1854)
- Order of the Sword, January 28, 1816
- Hederssabel, 1826
- Karl Johansmedaljen

=== Foreign Awards ===
- Denmark: Order of the Dannebrog
