= Herman von Hohenhausen =

Herman Ludvig von Hohenhausen
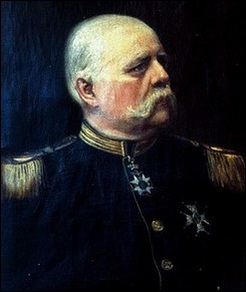
- Painting of Herman von Hohenhausen as regimental commander of the Gotland Infantry Regiment
- Born: April 24, 1827; Svinnegarn, Uppsala County, Sweden–Norway
- Died: December 21, 1902 (aged 75); Stockholm, Stockholm County, Sweden–Norway
- Spouse: Gustafva Fredrika Arnell (m. 1857)
- Military career
- Allegiance: Sweden–Norway
- Branch: Swedish Army; Norwegian Army
- Service years: 1848 – 1895
- Commands: Commander of the Gotland National Conscription

Herman Ludvig von Hohenhausen (April 24, 1827 – December 21, 1902), was a Swedish military colonel and a member of the von Hohenhausen Swedish noble family.

== Biography ==
Herman von Hohenhausen was born in Svinnegarn, Uppsala County, to Major General Carl Ludvig von Hohenhausen and Helena Charlotta Henrietta. His grandfather was Carl Johan von Hohenhausen and uncle Michael Silvius von Hohenhausen. Von Hohenhausen became a lieutenant in the First Life Grenadier Regiment in 1848 and was promoted to lieutenant in 1858, captain in 1863, major in 1871 and lieutenant colonel in the Hälsinge regiment in 1878. He became head of the 1st Infantry Volunteer School in Karlsborg that same year and was head of Jämtland Ranger Regiment. In 1879 became a colonel in the army, and was commander of Gotland National Conscription from the 1887 Gotland Infantry Regiment from 1884 to 1895. He retired in 1895 and died in Stockholm in 1902.

== Family ==
In 1857, von Hohenhausen married Gustafva Fredrika "Fredrique" Arnell (1831 – 1912), daughter of Colonel Lars Fredrik Arnell and Gustafva Catharina Johanna, born Hägerflycht. He was the father of Anna Helena Gustava (1858 – 1912) and Ebba Sofia Constantia Elisabeth (b. 1860).
