= Henrik Gyllenram =

Swedish military general, politician and civil servant

Gustaf Henrik Wilhelm Gyllenram
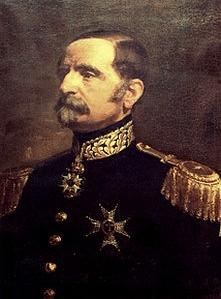

Governor of Gotland County
- In office 1862–1873
- Monarch: Charles XV
- Preceded by: Gillis Bildt
- Succeeded by: Rudolf Horn

Governor of Värmland County
- In office 1873–1885
- Monarch: Oscar II
- Preceded by: Johan Henrik Rosenswärd
- Succeeded by: Henrik Adolf Widmark

Personal details
- Born: 5 May 1814 Gottröra, Stockholm County, Sweden
- Died: 17 November 1890 (aged 76) Stockholm, Stockholm County, Sweden-Norway
- Relations: Henric Fredric Gyllenram

Military service
- Allegiance: Sweden-Norway
- Branch/service: Swedish Army
- Years of service: 1833–1873
- Rank: Major General
- Commands: Gotland National Conscription

Gustaf Henrik Wilhelm Gyllenram (1814-1890) was a Swedish military general, politician, and civil servant. He was the father of Henric Fredric Gyllenram.

== Biography ==
Gyllenram was the son of Major Bernhard Fredrik Gyllenram and his wife Countess Beata Christina Lovisa Douglas of the Douglas family. He was married in 1840 with Ebba Augusta Arnell.

Gyllenram became second lieutenant of the Second Life Grenadier Regiment in 1833, lieutenant in 1846, captain in 1854, major in 1858, lieutenant colonel in 1862, colonel in the Army in 1862, military commander and head of the Gotland National Conscription in 1862-73 and Major General in 1863. He was also the Governor of Gotland County from 1862 to 1873 and in Värmland County 1873–1885.

Gyllenram participated in the Riksdag negotiations during the term of office as a self-appointed member of the knighthood and nobility at the Riksdags in 1853–1854, 1856–1858, 1862–1863 and 1865–1866. In the years 1866–1874, he sat in the first chamber of the Riksdag, elected by the Gotland County Council. In the years 1885–1888, he belonged to the same chamber, but was elected by the Värmland County Council.
