= Barlingbo Church =

- Barlingbo kyrka
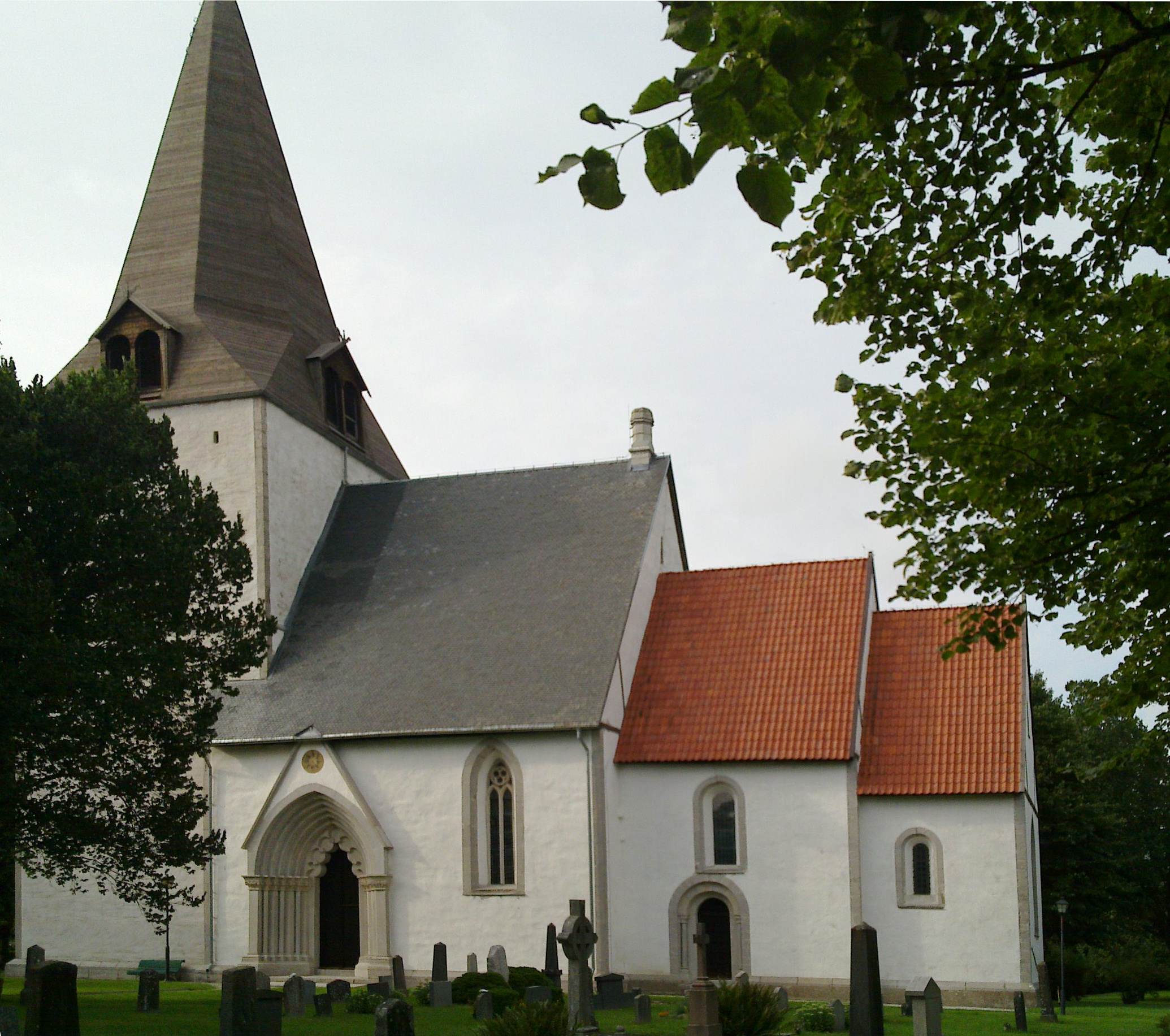
- Barlingbo Church, view of the exterior

- Location on Gotland
- 57°33′52″N 18°27′47″E
- Country: Sweden
- Denomination: Church of Sweden

Administration
- Diocese: Visby

Barlingbo Church (Swedish: Barlingbo kyrka) is a medieval church in Barlingbo on the Swedish island of Gotland. It dates from the 13th century and has been altered little since. It contains furnishings from several centuries, including an unusual medieval baptismal font, decorated with figures and runes. The church belongs to the Church of Sweden and lies in the Diocese of Visby.

== History and architecture ==
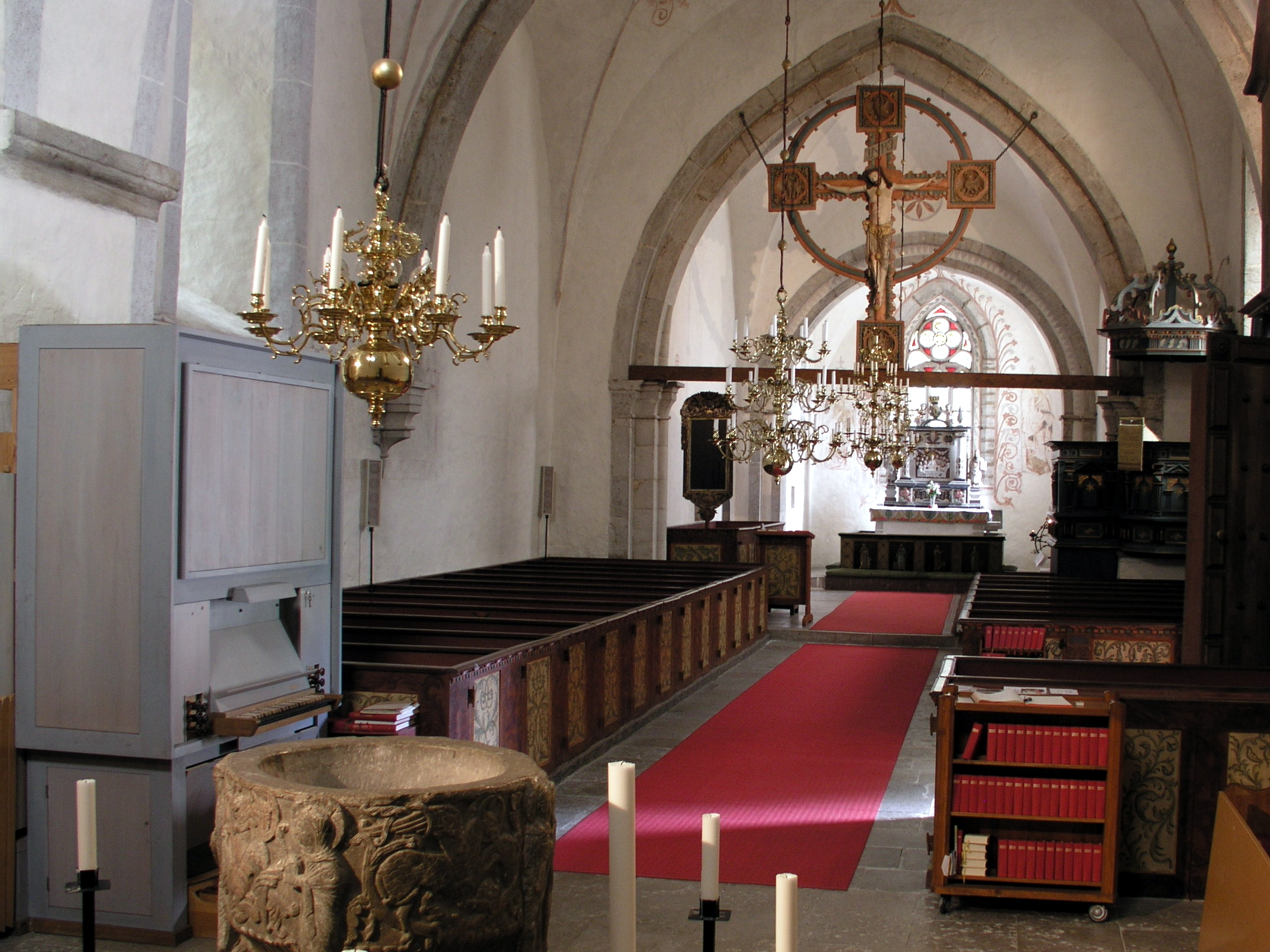
Barlingbo Church nave

The presently visible church was finished c. 1280. It was however preceded by another church, whose foundations have been discovered under the floor of the present one. The oldest parts of Barlingbo Church are the choir and apse. These have been dated to 1225. Following this, the nave was built, and lastly the tower. The church in its entirety dates from the 13th century.

The church has three portals, two of which are in Gothic style and one, the oldest, which is still in the Romanesque tradition. The largest of the Gothic portals seems to have been inserted after the walls were built, as it is obviously too large for the façade and the walls have been made thicker around it in order to accommodate it. This portal dates from c. 1300. In the western, tower façade there is a rose window. There are also Gothic windows with still extant stained glass from c. 1280 in the apse and the south façade, one of only a few instances of preserved medieval stained glass in Sweden in situ.

Inside, Barlingbo Church is divided by vaults in three sections, length-wise. It is a single-nave church. Its consciously conceived plan has been interpreted as being influenced by Cistercian architecture. The walls are decorated by murals from different times. Oldest of these are a number of purely decorative, grey triangles and crosses, dating perhaps from the earliest construction period. A set of more monumental but likewise purely decorative paintings in the nave and around the east window of the apse date from c. 1280. Later, from the 14th century, are murals in the apse depicting six apostles, unique in their appearance on Gotland.

Among the furnishings, the medieval altar (which has probably once housed a relic) has a Baroque top, dated 1683 and with the monogram of King Charles XI of Sweden. The triumphal cross featuring the crucified Jesus is from c. 1240 and is attributed to the anonymous Tingstädemästaren. In the choir, some tombstones from the 13th and 14th centuries are visible, and the pulpit, itself dating from 1673, has been placed on a medieval side altar. The pews and the organ cover are from the 19th century. One of the church bells is from c. 1440 and carries inscriptions evoking Christ, Mary and Saint Dionysius; the latter is believed to have been the patron saint of the church in Catholic times.

An unusual item in the church is the baptismal font, dating from the second part of the 12th century and richly decorated with carved figures. It displays figures from the Bible and the symbols of the evangelists. Some of the figures are also marked with runes. The font, carved from a single block of limestone, is not comparable to any other baptismal font on Gotland. Swedish art historian Johnny Roosval (1879–1965) considered it to be one of the finest pieces of art from medieval Sweden. Influences from medieval English art from the time have also been traced in the font.

The church belongs to the Church of Sweden and lies within the Diocese of Visby.

== Parsonage ==
Close to the church lies the old parsonage. It was built in 1902 in a style mixing Gothic Revival with Renaissance Revival architecture. This turn-of-the-century interpretation of Medieval architecture is unique on Gotland.
