= Follingbo Church =

- Follingbo kyrka
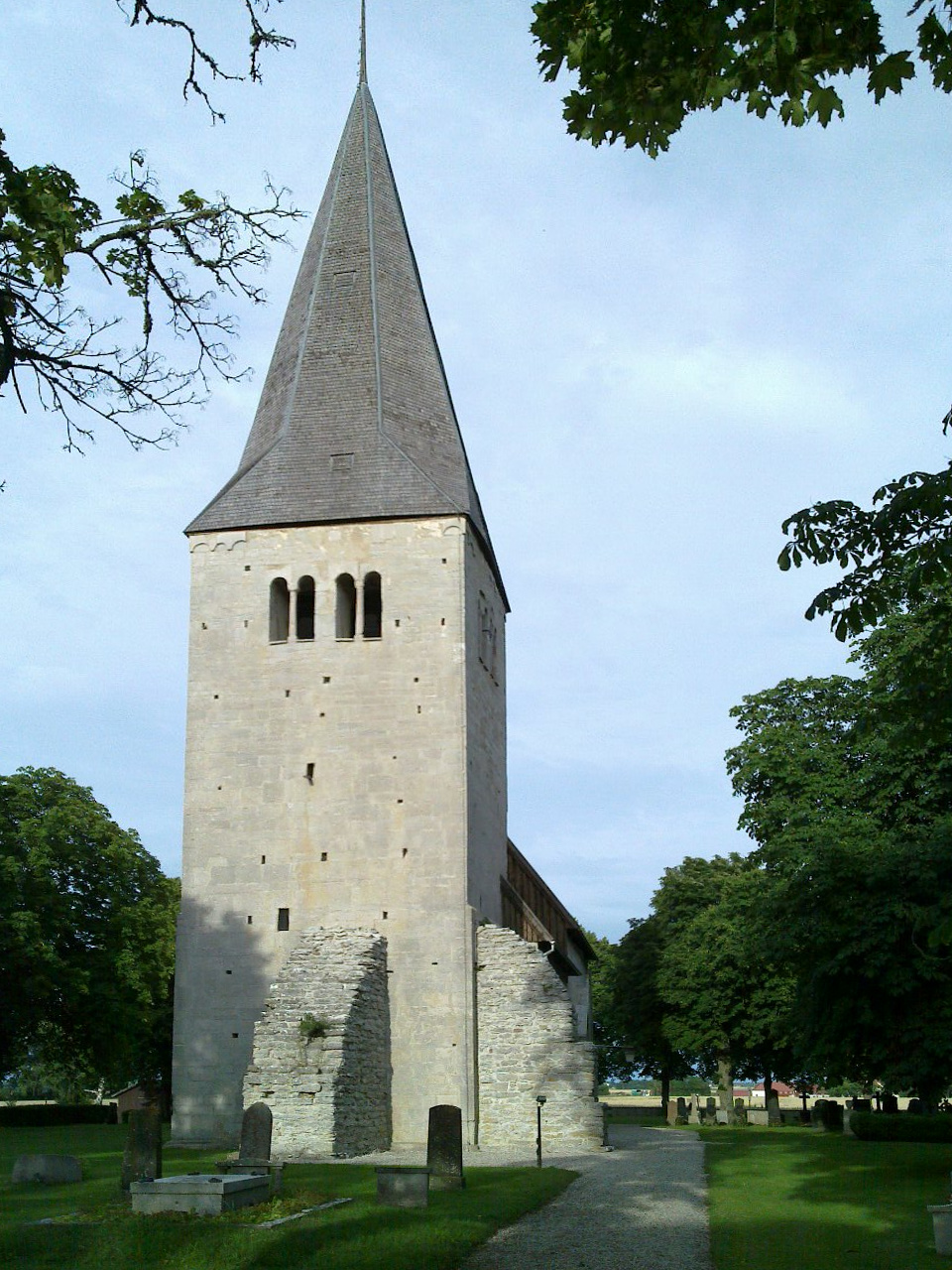
- Follingbo Church, view with the Romanesque tower

- Location on Gotland
- 57°34′56″N 18°23′00″E
- Country: Sweden
- Denomination: Church of Sweden

Administration
- Diocese: Visby

Follingbo Church (Swedish: Follingbo kyrka) is a medieval church in Follingbo on the Swedish island of Gotland. Its Romanesque nave and tower are noteworthy for the professionalism with which they were built. It lies in the Diocese of Visby and is used of the Church of Sweden.

== History and architecture ==
The oldest parts of Follingbo Church are the nave and tower. They date from circa 1200 and together form an unusually accomplished example of Romanesque architecture on Gotland. Although lacking in ornamental sculpture, the tower and nave were clearly built by skilled and experienced builders, in contrast to some other Romanesque churches on Gotland. The choir is later (late 13th century) and already Gothic in style, and also considered unusual for its kind. The choir replaced an earlier, Romanesque choir with an apse. The current choir instead has a straight eastern wall, adorned with a single tracery window, in which fragments of medieval stained glass panes remain. The sacristy was built in 1820-21.

Inside, the church has a painted ceiling, decorated at the end of the 17th century. Most of the furnishings are also from the 17th or 18th century. An exception is the undecorated baptismal font, which is medieval.

The church underwent a renovation in 1955-56.

Follingbo Church belongs to the Church of Sweden and lies within the Diocese of Visby.
