= Björke Church =

- Björke kyrka
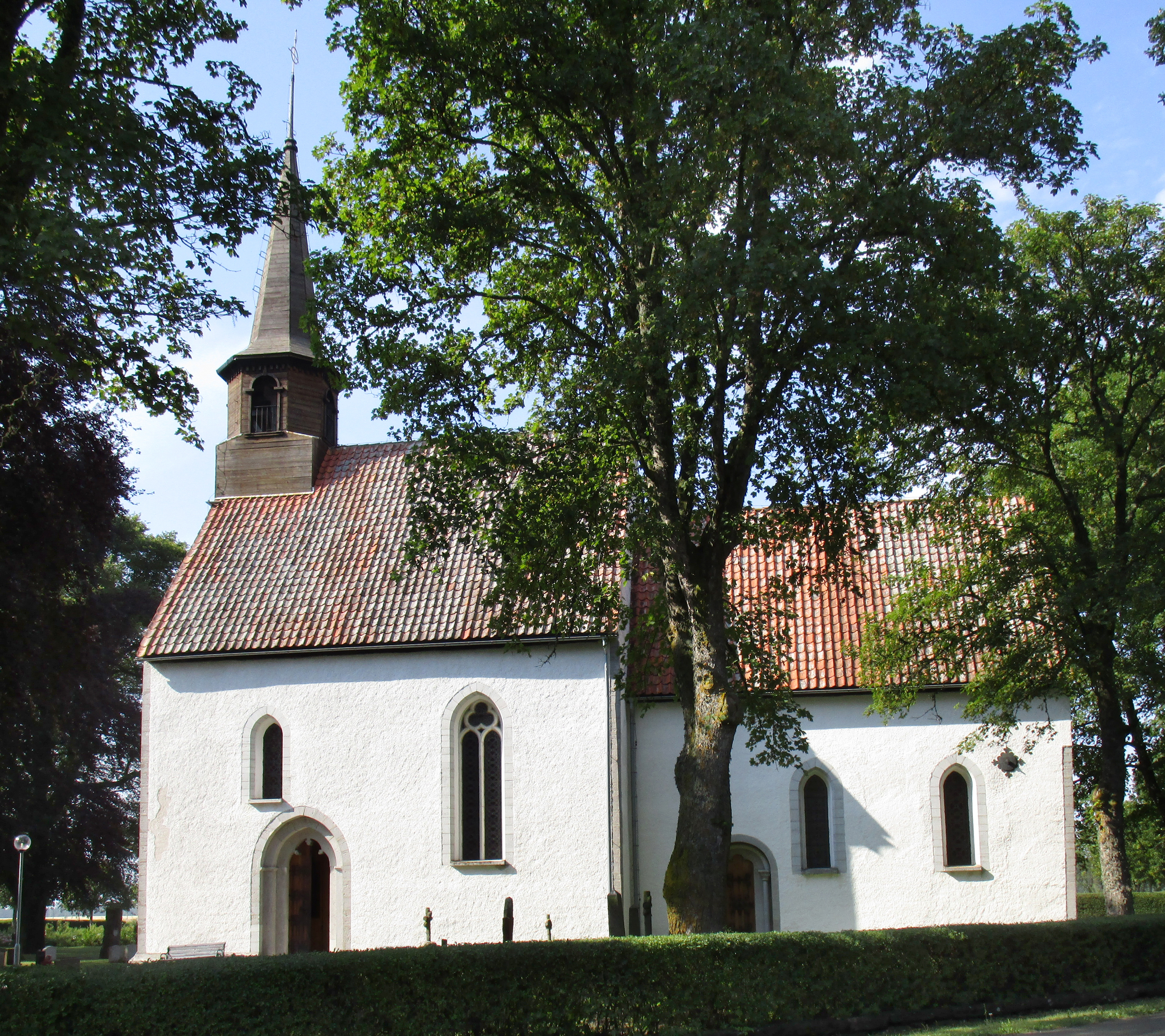
- Björke Church, view of the exterior

- Location on Gotland
- 57°30′27″N 18°25′17″E
- Country: Sweden
- Denomination: Church of Sweden

Björke Church (Swedish: Björke kyrka) is a medieval church in Björke on the Swedish island of Gotland, in the Diocese of Visby.

The nave is the oldest part of Björke Church, dating from the mid-13th century. The choir dates from the middle of the 14th century and replaced an earlier choir, half the size of the present one. A church tower was planned but never built. The sacristy is the last part to be added the church; it dates from 1860.

Internally, the church ceiling is supported by six vaults – two in the choir and four, resting on a central column, in the nave. Among the furnishings, the crucifix dates from 1160 and the pulpit from 1594; it is one of the oldest on Gotland. Of later date are the altarpiece (1911) and the votive ship, donated to the church in 2004.

The church underwent a renovation in 1910–12.

Björke Church belongs to the Church of Sweden and lies within the Diocese of Visby.
