= Björke, Gotland =

Björke
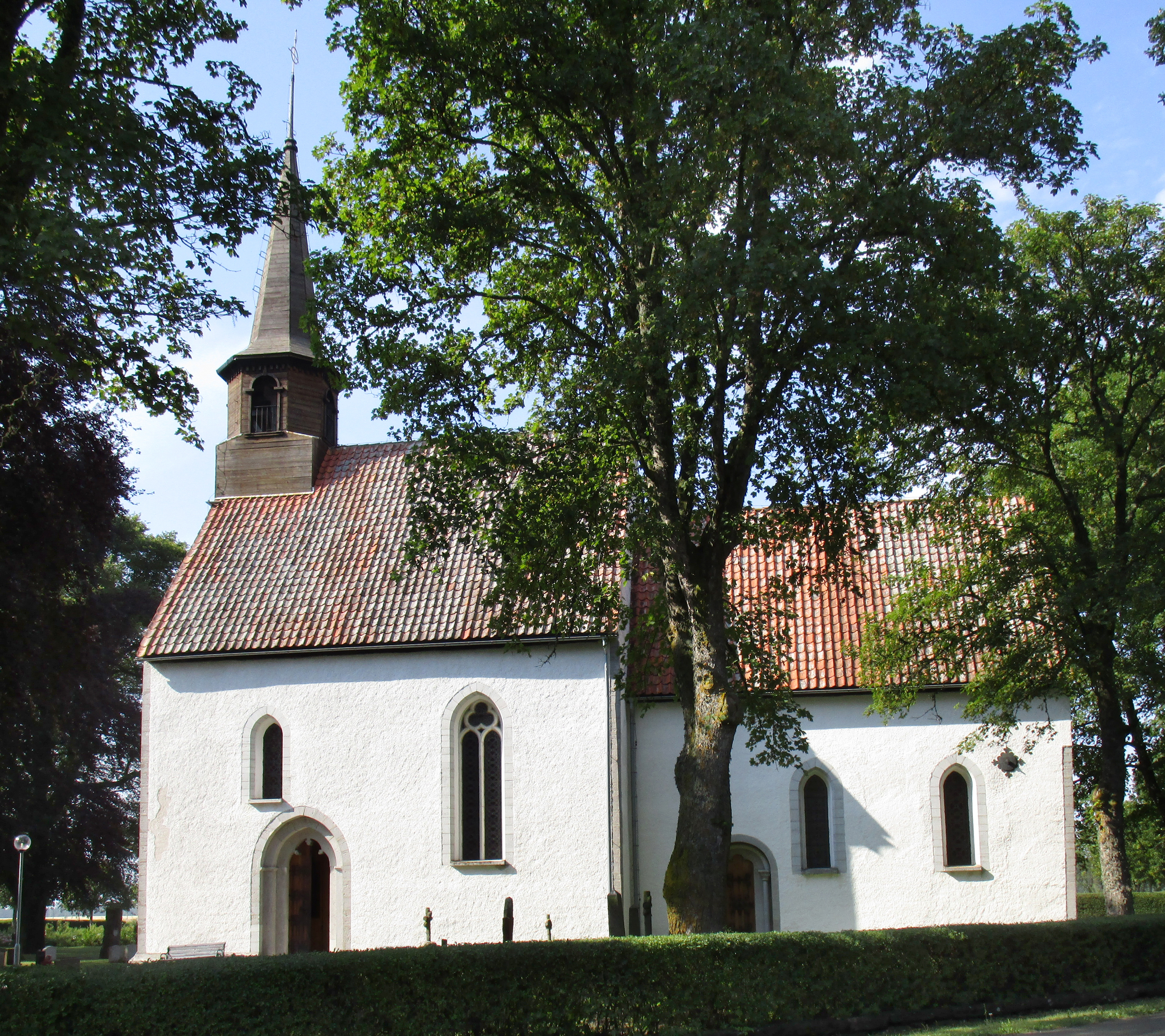
- Björke Church

- Location within Gotland
- Coordinates: 57°30′26″N 18°25′16″E
- Country: Sweden
- Province: Gotland
- County: Gotland County
- Municipality: Gotland Municipality

Area
  - Total: 12.14 km^{2} (4.69 sq mi)

Population (2014)
  - Total: 410
- Time zone: UTC+1 (CET)
  - Summer (DST): UTC+2 (CEST)

Björke is a populated area, a socken (not to be confused with parish), on the Swedish island of Gotland. It comprises the same area as the administrative Björke District, established on 1 January 2016.

== Geography ==
Björke is situated in the central part of Gotland. The medieval Björke Church is located in the socken. As of 2019, Björke Church belongs to Björke parish in Romaklosters pastorat.
