= Hejnum =

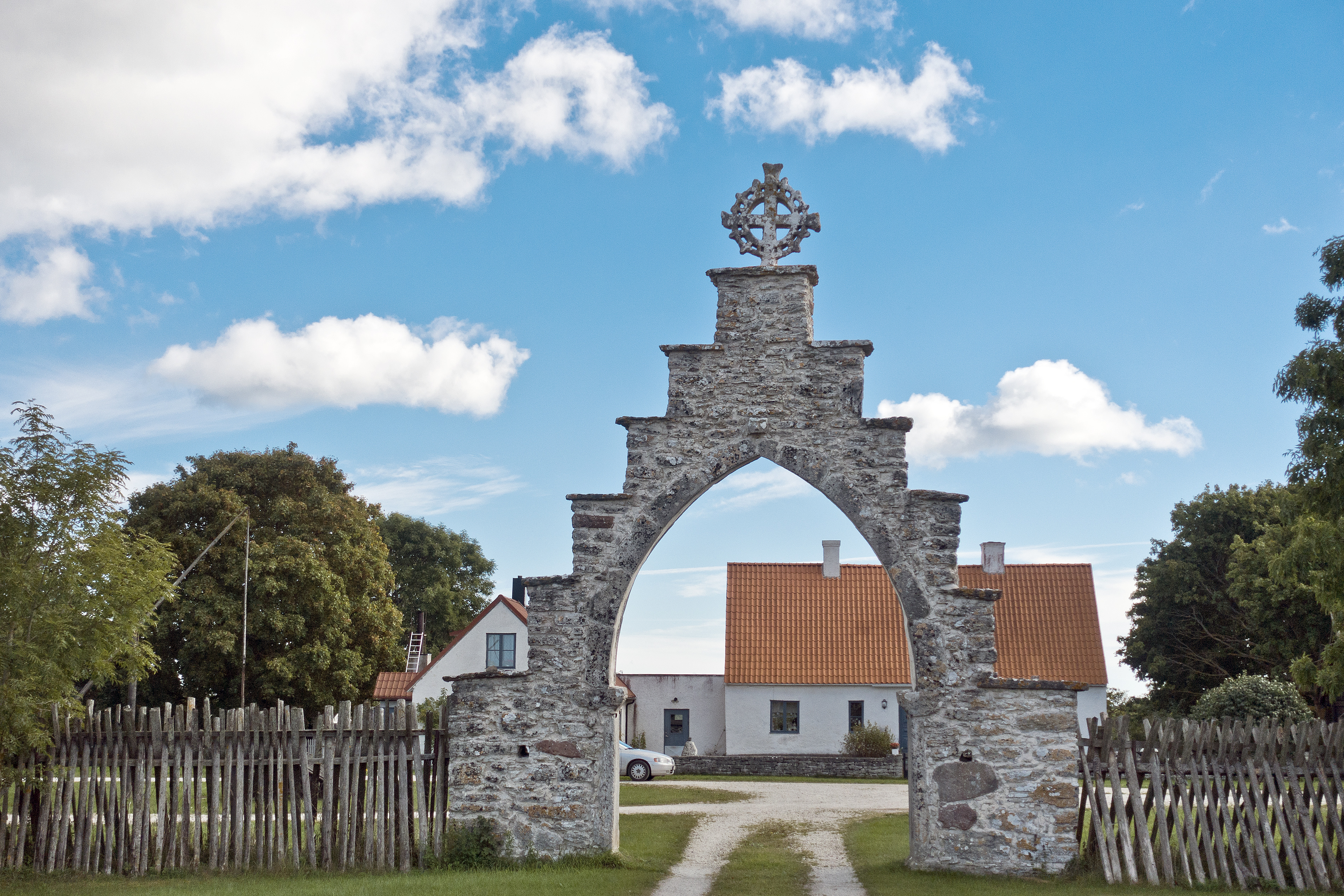
- The gate portal at Riddare in Hejnum

- Location within Gotland
- Coordinates: 57°40′48″N 18°37′55″E
- Country: Sweden
- Province: Gotland
- County: Gotland County
- Municipality: Gotland Municipality

Area
  - Total: 45.01 km^{2} (17.38 sq mi)

Population (2016)
  - Total: 102
- Time zone: UTC+1 (CET)
  - Summer (DST): UTC+2 (CEST)
- Website: hejnum.se

Hejnum is a populated area, a socken (not to be confused with parish), on the Swedish island of Gotland. It comprises the same area as the administrative Hejnum District, established on 1 January 2016.

== Geography ==
Hejnum is situated in the northern inland of Gotland just south of Lake Tingstäde. Central Hejnum consists of flat farmlands with forest area in the west and east. The medieval Hejnum Church is situated in the socken. As of 2019, Hejnum Church belongs to Väskinde parish in Norra Gotlands pastorat, along with the churches in Väskinde, Fole, Lokrume, Bro and Bäl.

There are four nature reserves in Hejnum: File hajdar, Hejnum hällar, Kallgatburg and Tiselhagen.

== History ==
One of the most magnificent medieval gate portals on Gotland, is at the Riddare farm in Hejnum.
