= Bäl =

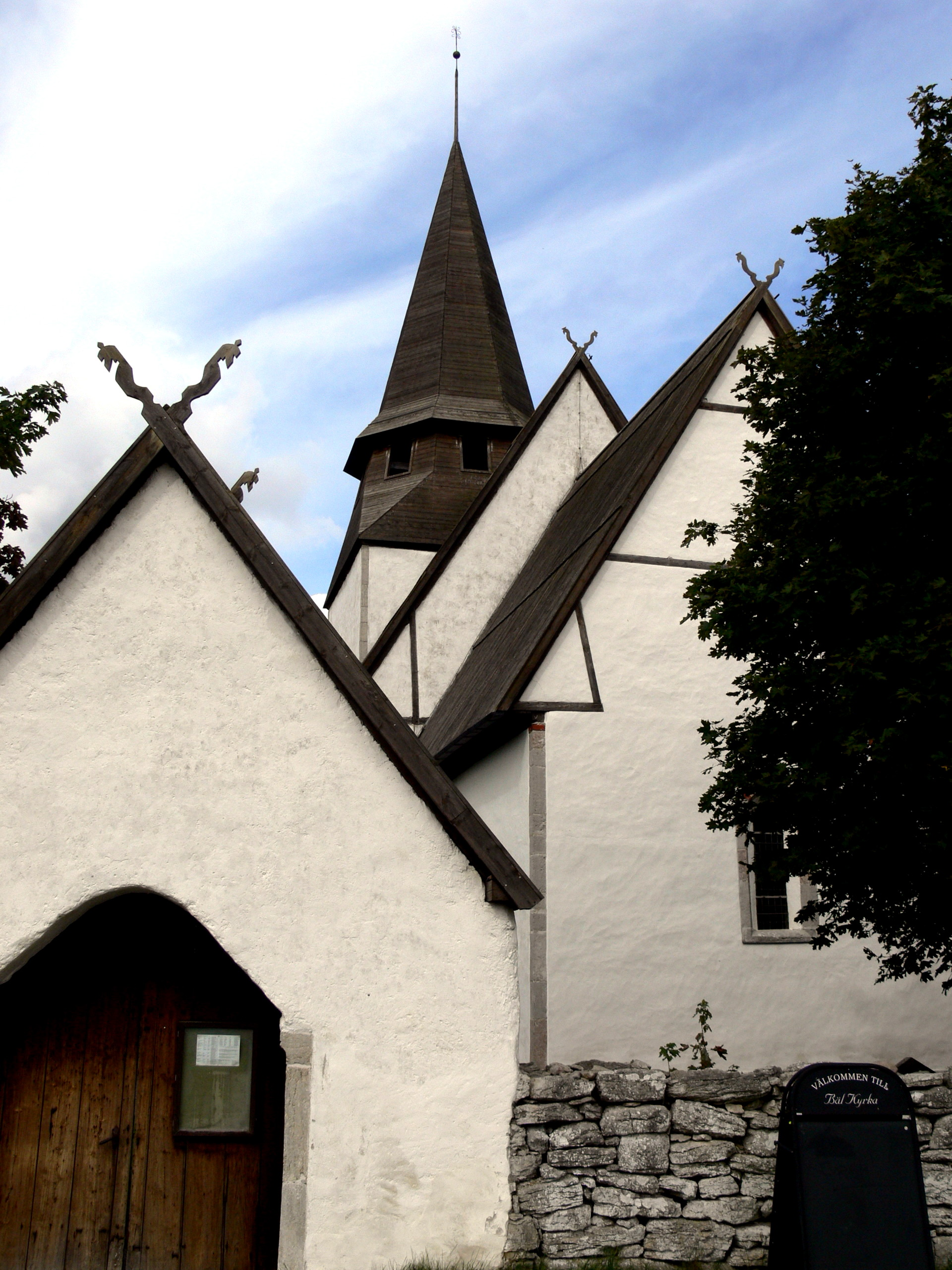
- Bäl Church

- Location within Gotland
- Coordinates: 57°38′41″N 18°37′58″E
- Country: Sweden
- Province: Gotland
- County: Gotland County
- Municipality: Gotland Municipality

Area
  - Total: 24.87 km^{2} (9.60 sq mi)

Population (2014)
  - Total: 114
- Time zone: UTC+1 (CET)
  - Summer (DST): UTC+2 (CEST)

Bäl is a populated area, a socken (not to be confused with parish), on the Swedish island of Gotland. It comprises the same area as the administrative Bäl District, established on 1 January 2016.

== Geography ==
Bäl is the name of the larger area, Bäl socken as well as the Bäl district, surrounding the small village of Gute where the medieval Bäl Church, is located. Gute is sometimes referred to as Bäl, Bäl kyrkby or Bäls kyrkby Gute. It is situated in the northeast part of Gotland.

As of 2019, Bäl Church belongs to Väskinde parish in Norra Gotlands pastorat, along with the churches in Väskinde, Fole, Lokrume, Hejnum and Bro.

One of the asteroids in the asteroid belt, 8678 Bäl, is named after this place.
