= Lokrume =

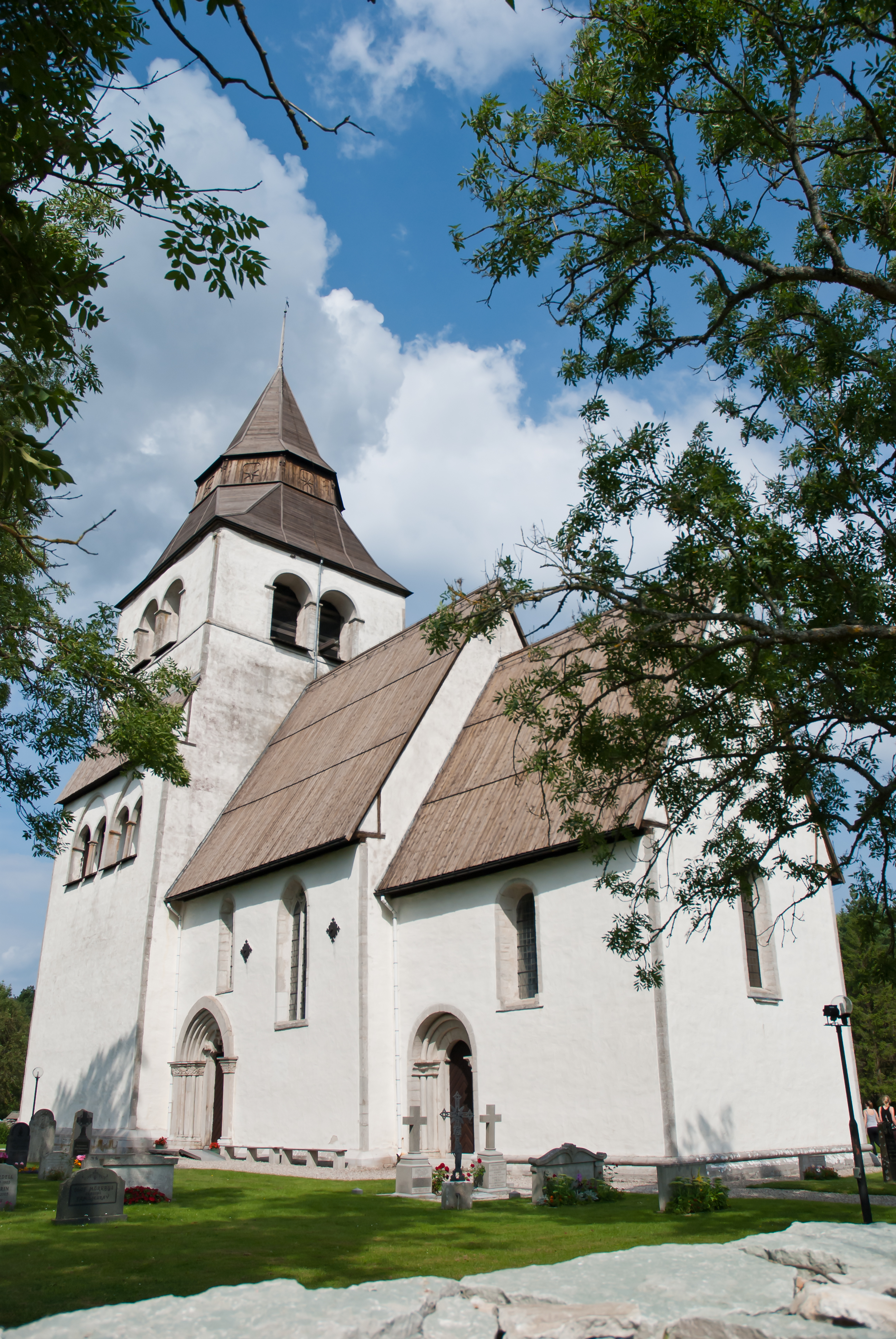
- Lokrume Church

- Location within Gotland
- Coordinates: 57°41′0″N 18°32′0″E
- Country: Sweden
- Province: Gotland
- County: Gotland County
- Municipality: Gotland Municipality

Area
  - Total: 34.91 km^{2} (13.48 sq mi)

Population (2014)
  - Total: 272
- Time zone: UTC+1 (CET)
  - Summer (DST): UTC+2 (CEST)
- Website: www.lokrume.se

Lokrume (Swedish pronunciation: [ˈlûːkˌrɵmːɛ]) is a populated area, a socken (not to be confused with parish), on the Swedish island of Gotland. It comprises the same area as the administrative Lokrume District, established on 1 January 2016.

== Geography ==
Lokrume is the name of the socken as well as the district. It is also the name of the small village surrounding the medieval Lokrume Church, sometimes referred to as Lokrume kyrkby. It is situated in the central northern part of Gotland, with farmed land to the north and forests in the south.

As of 2019, Lokrume Church belongs to Väskinde parish in Norra Gotlands pastorat, along with the churches in Väskinde, Fole, Bro, Hejnum and Bäl.

One of the asteroids in the Asteroid belt, 9267 Lokrume, is named after this place.

== History ==
The name Lokrume is from the 14th century name Lokarum and consists of the lok or lauk being the name of a farm, Lauks, and rum meaning "open place". This sums up to "The open place belonging to the Lauks people". Gervid Lauk was a 14th-century county judge living in Lokrume, one of the medieval houses belonging to his estate still remains at the Lauks farm.

There are several minor Viking Age grave fields and stone ships, as well as larger stones with Iron Age grinding grooves. Four silver treasures has been found at Lokrume, as was the Viking Age Lokrume helmet fragment.
