= Bro, Gotland =

Bro Bro and Duss
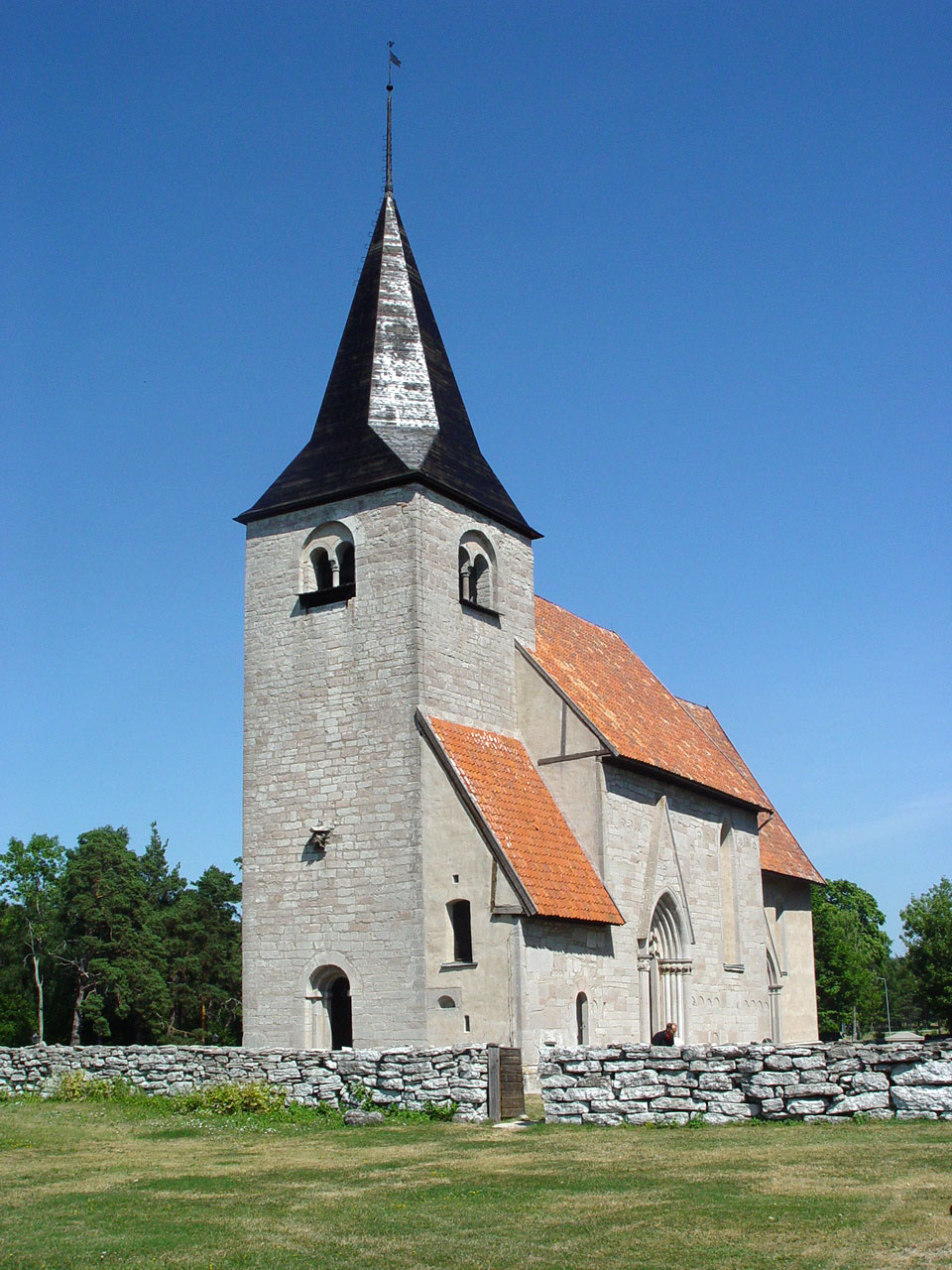
- Bro Church

- Location within Gotland
- Coordinates: 57°40′8″N 18°28′43″E
- Country: Sweden
- Province: Gotland
- County: Gotland County
- Municipality: Gotland Municipality

Area
  - Total: 24 km^{2} (9.3 sq mi)

Population (2014)
  - Total: 389
- Time zone: UTC+1 (CET)
  - Summer (DST): UTC+2 (CEST)
- Website: brosocken.se

Bro (sometimes called Bro and Duss) is a populated area, a socken (not to be confused with parish), on the Swedish island of Gotland. It comprises the same area as the administrative Bro District, established on 1 January 2016.

== Geography ==
Bro is the name of the socken as well as the district. It is also the name of the small village surrounding the medieval Bro Church, sometimes referred to as Bro kyrkby. It is situated in the northwest part of Gotland, northeast of Visby.

As of 2019, Bro Church belongs to Väskinde parish in Norra Gotlands pastorat, along with the churches in Väskinde, Fole, Lokrume, Hejnum and Bäl.

One of the asteroids in the asteroid belt, 10128 Bro, is named after this place.

== Gallery ==
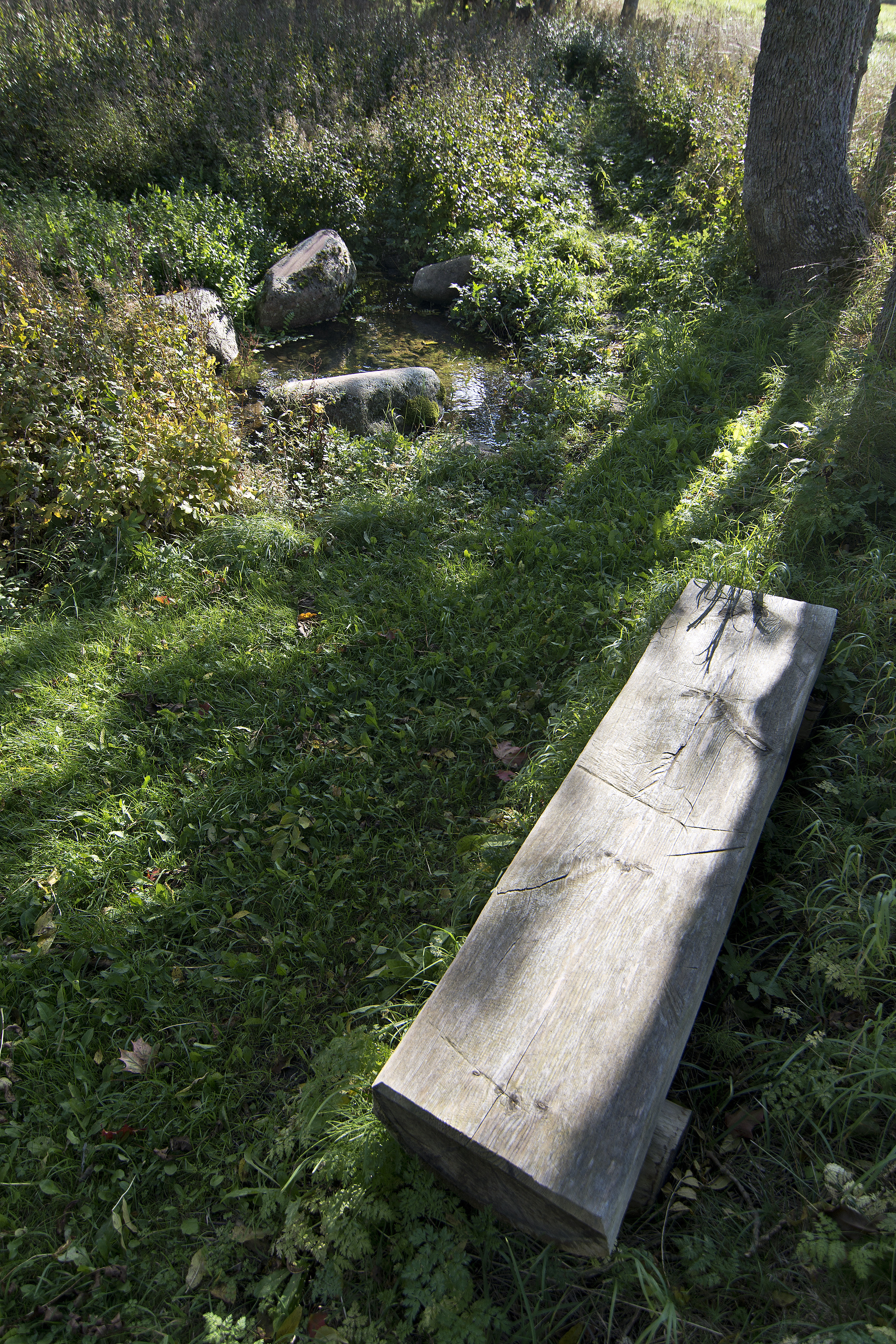
Holy spring at Bro.

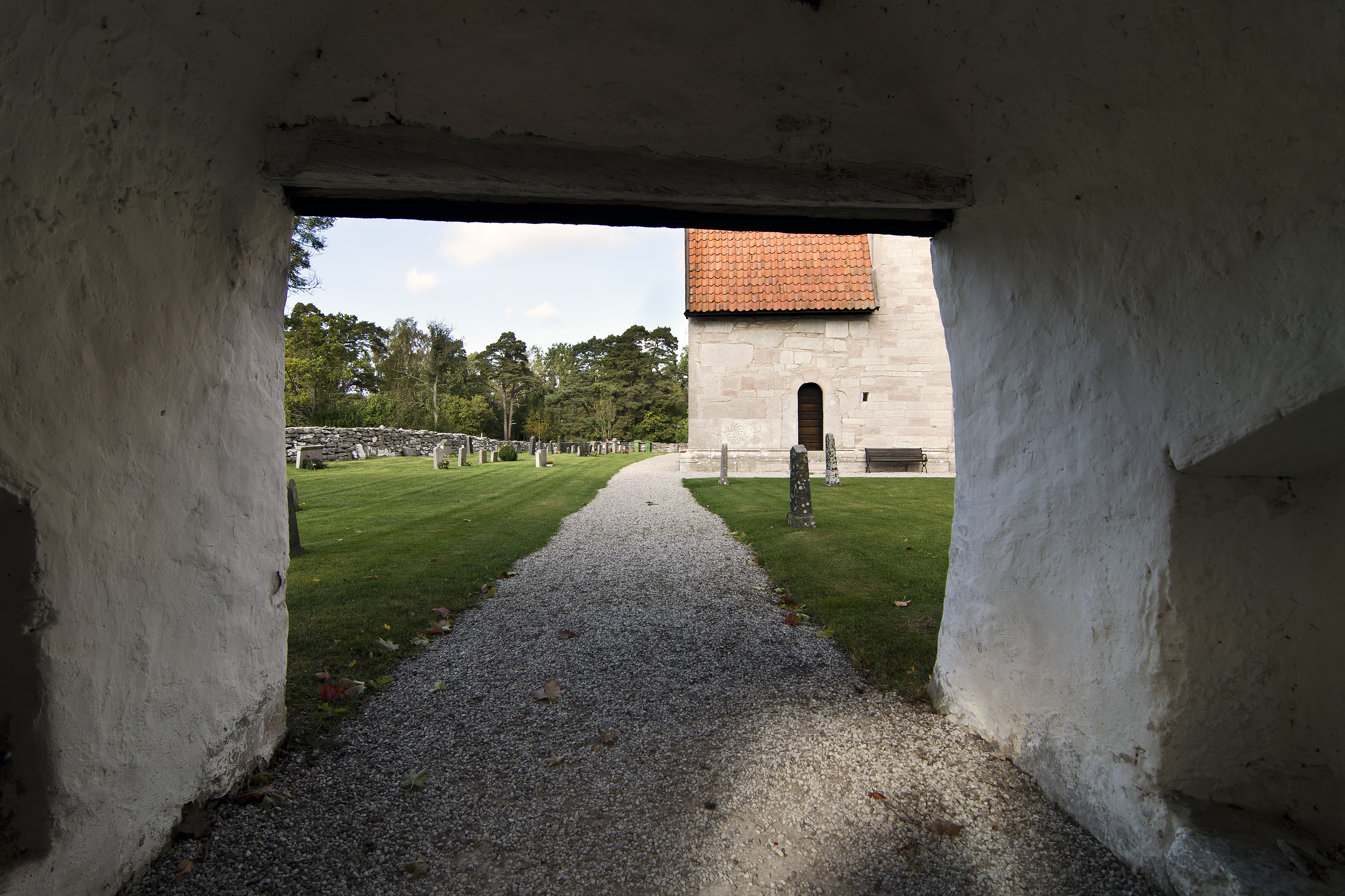
Church yard at Bro church.

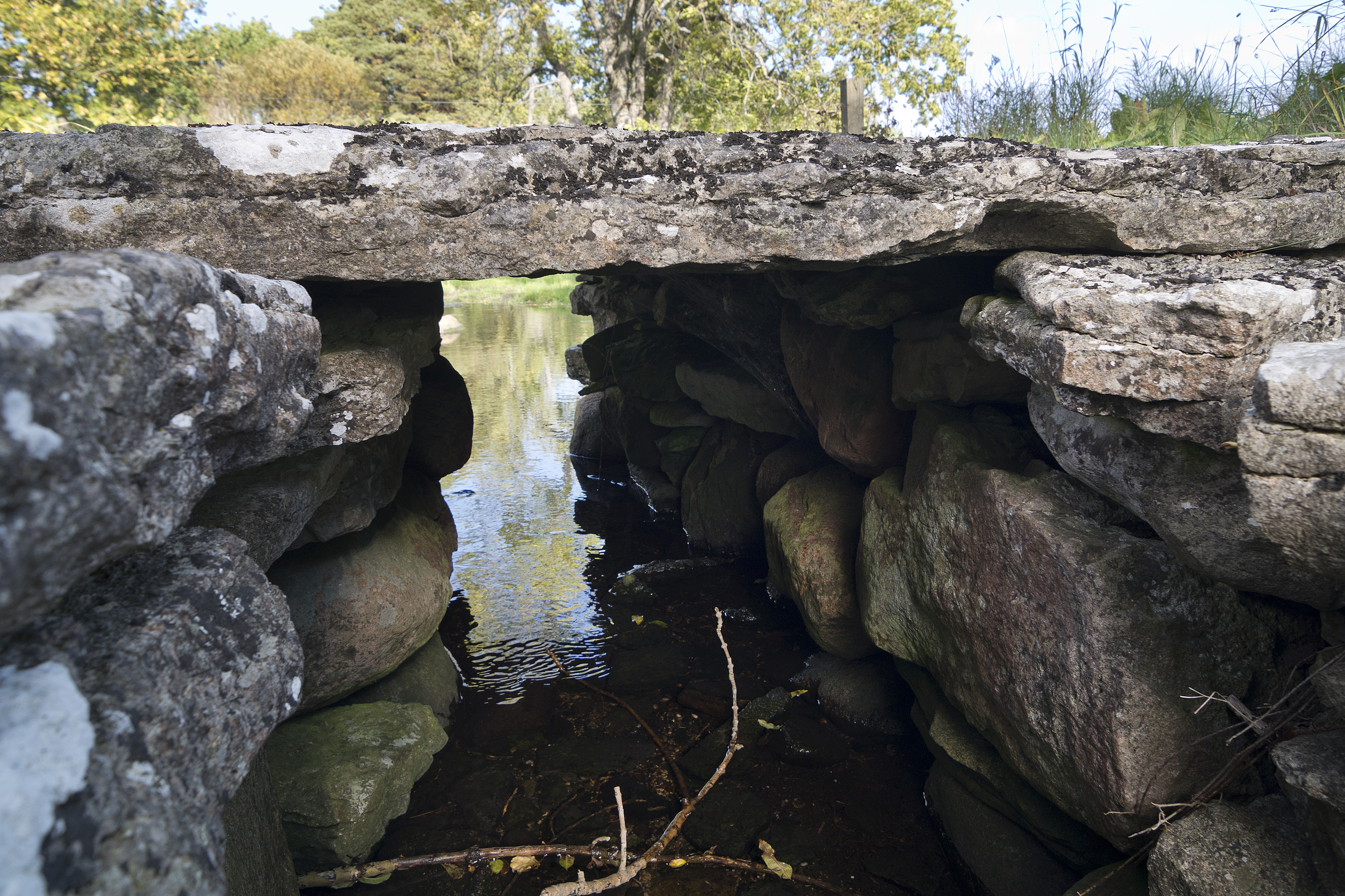
Old stone bridge at Bro.

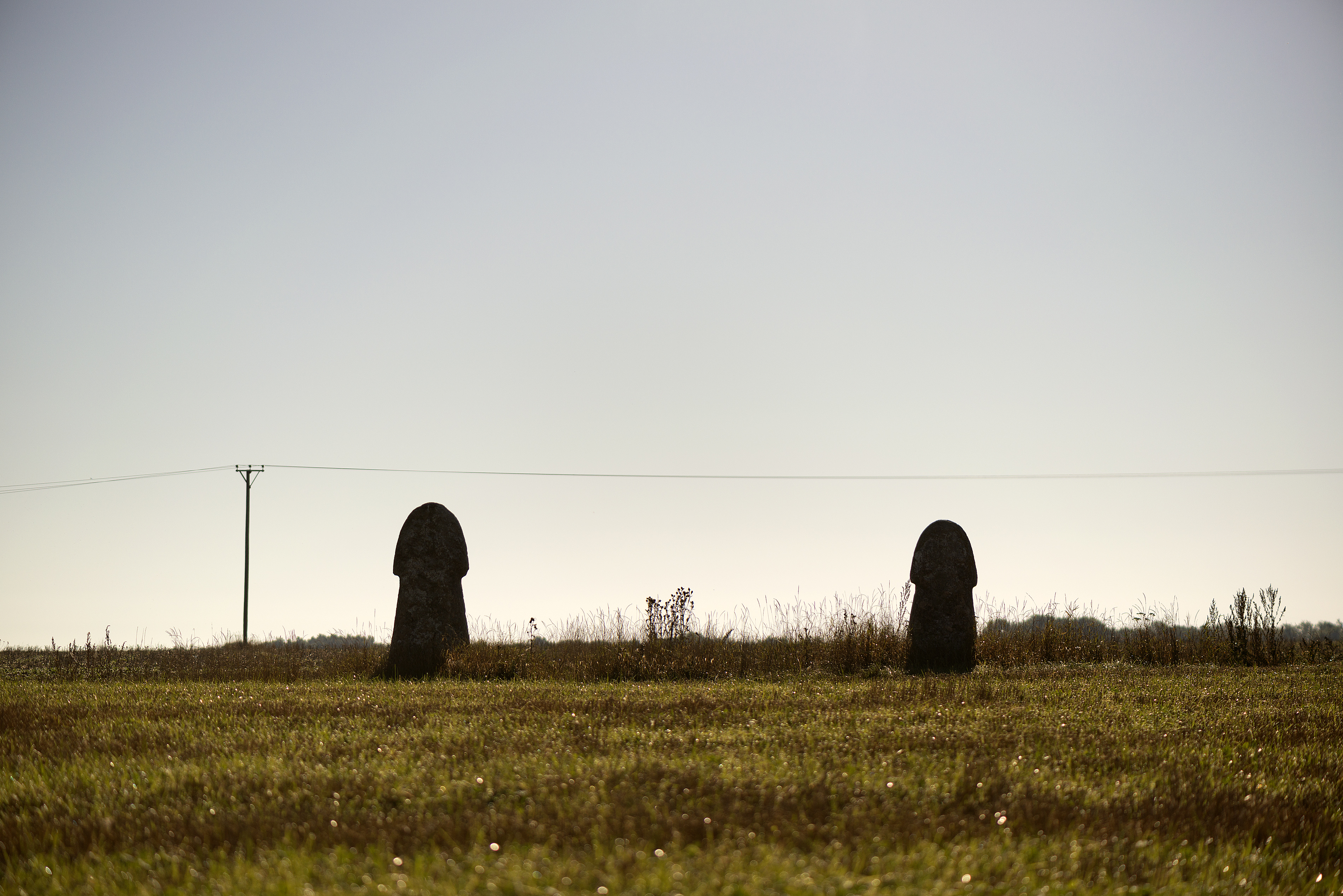
Picture stones at Bro.
