= Follingbo =

Region of the Swedish island of Gotland

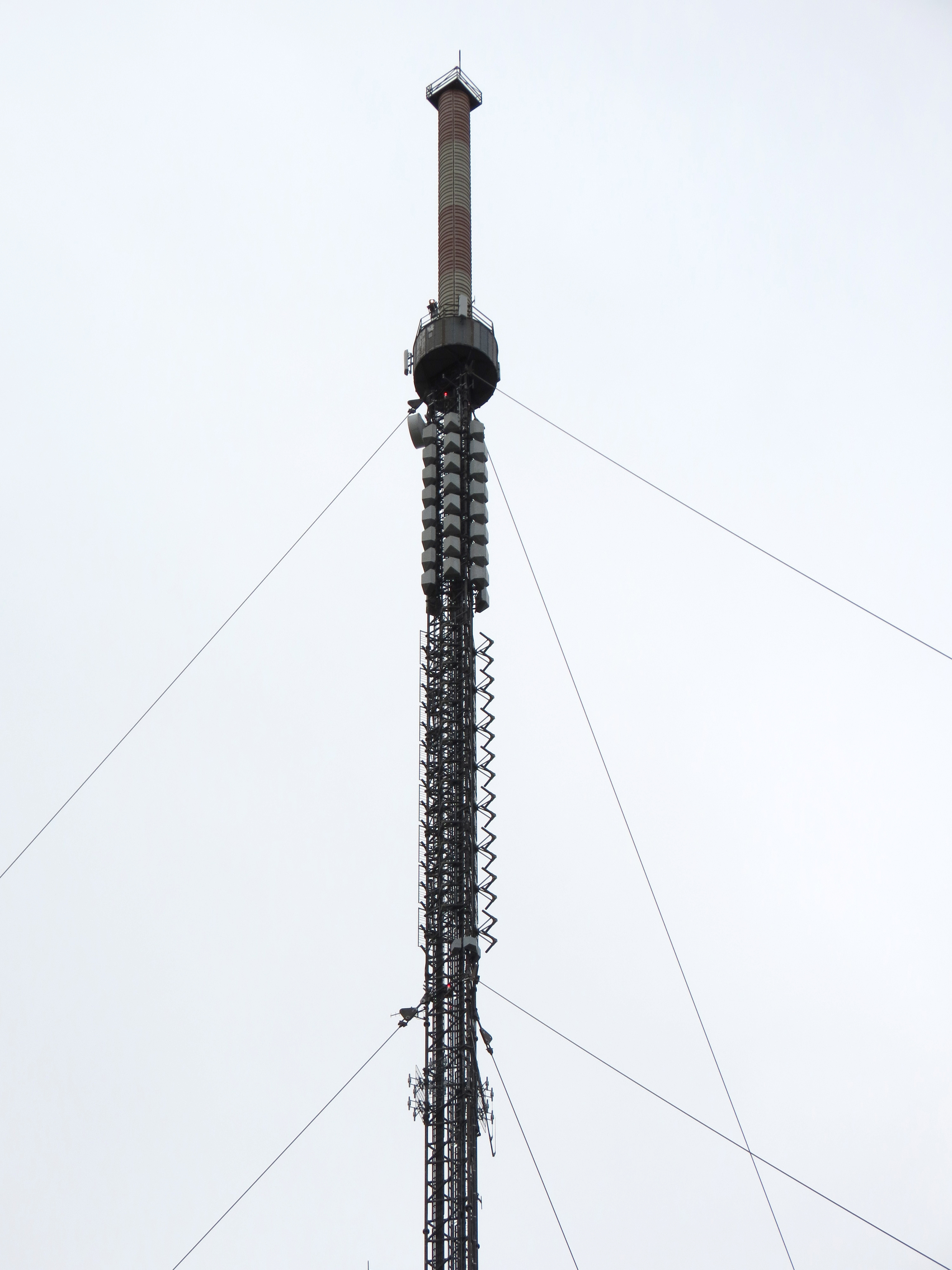
- Top of the Follingbo transmitter mast in Follingbo

- Location within Gotland
- Coordinates: 57°34′56″N 18°23′0″E
- Country: Sweden
- Province: Gotland
- County: Gotland County
- Municipality: Gotland Municipality

Area
  - Total: 37.01 km^{2} (14.29 sq mi)

Population (2014)
  - Total: 446
- Time zone: UTC+1 (CET)
  - Summer (DST): UTC+2 (CEST)
- Website: follingbo.se

Follingbo is a populated area, a socken (not to be confused with parish), on the Swedish island of Gotland. It comprises the same area as the administrative Follingbo District, established on 1 January 2016.

The most distinguishing feature in Follingbo is the 260 m (850 ft) high Follingbo transmitter. It became operational on 24 December 1959, and has since then been used for broadcasting television and radio to all of Gotland.

== Geography ==
Follingbo is the name of the socken as well as the district. It is also the name of the small village surrounding the medieval Follingbo Church, sometimes referred to as Follingbo kyrkby. It is situated in the west part of Gotland, just east of Visby.

As of 2019, Follingbo Church belongs to Follingbo parish in Romaklosters pastorat.

By the Svaide vät lake in Follingbo is Svaidestugan, a recreation area with tracks for running in summer and cross-country skiing in winter. In 2015, plans were made to restore the partially overgrown lake to its former open state and use it for ice skating.
