= Fole =

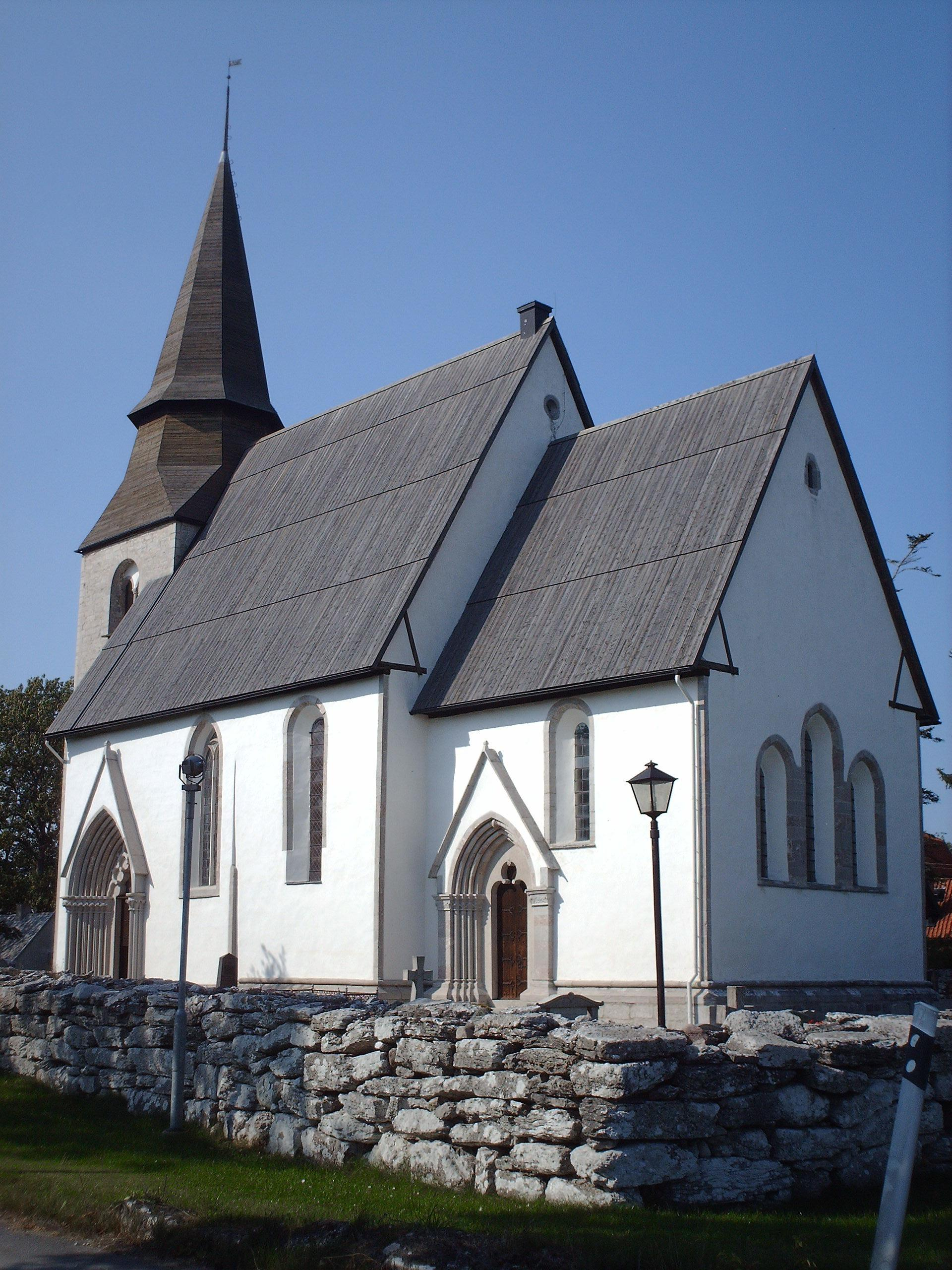
- Fole Church

- Location within Gotland
- Coordinates: 57°39′2″N 18°32′41″E
- Country: Sweden
- Province: Gotland
- County: Gotland County
- Municipality: Gotland Municipality

Population (2010)
  - Total: 427
- Time zone: UTC+1 (CET)
  - Summer (DST): UTC+2 (CEST)
- Website: www.fole.se

Fole (Swedish pronunciation: [ˈfûːlɛ]) is a populated area, a socken (not to be confused with parish), on the Swedish island of Gotland. It comprises the same area as the administrative Fole District, established on 1 January 2016.

== Geography ==
Fole is the name of the socken as well as the district. It is also the name of the small village surrounding the medieval Fole Church, sometimes referred to as Fole kyrkby. It is situated in the central northern part of Gotland.

Fole Church is a 13th-century edifice mixing Romanesque and Gothic elements. As of 2019, Fole Church belongs to Väskinde parish in Norra Gotlands pastorat, along with the churches in Bro, Väskinde, Lokrume, Hejnum and Bäl.

One of the asteroids in the Asteroid belt, 10129 Fole, is named after this place.

== History ==
A number of gold bracteates and other Viking Age jewelry has been found at Fole.

Fole Idrottsförening ("Fole Sports Club") is one of the oldest on Gotland, founded in 1894.

== Gallery ==
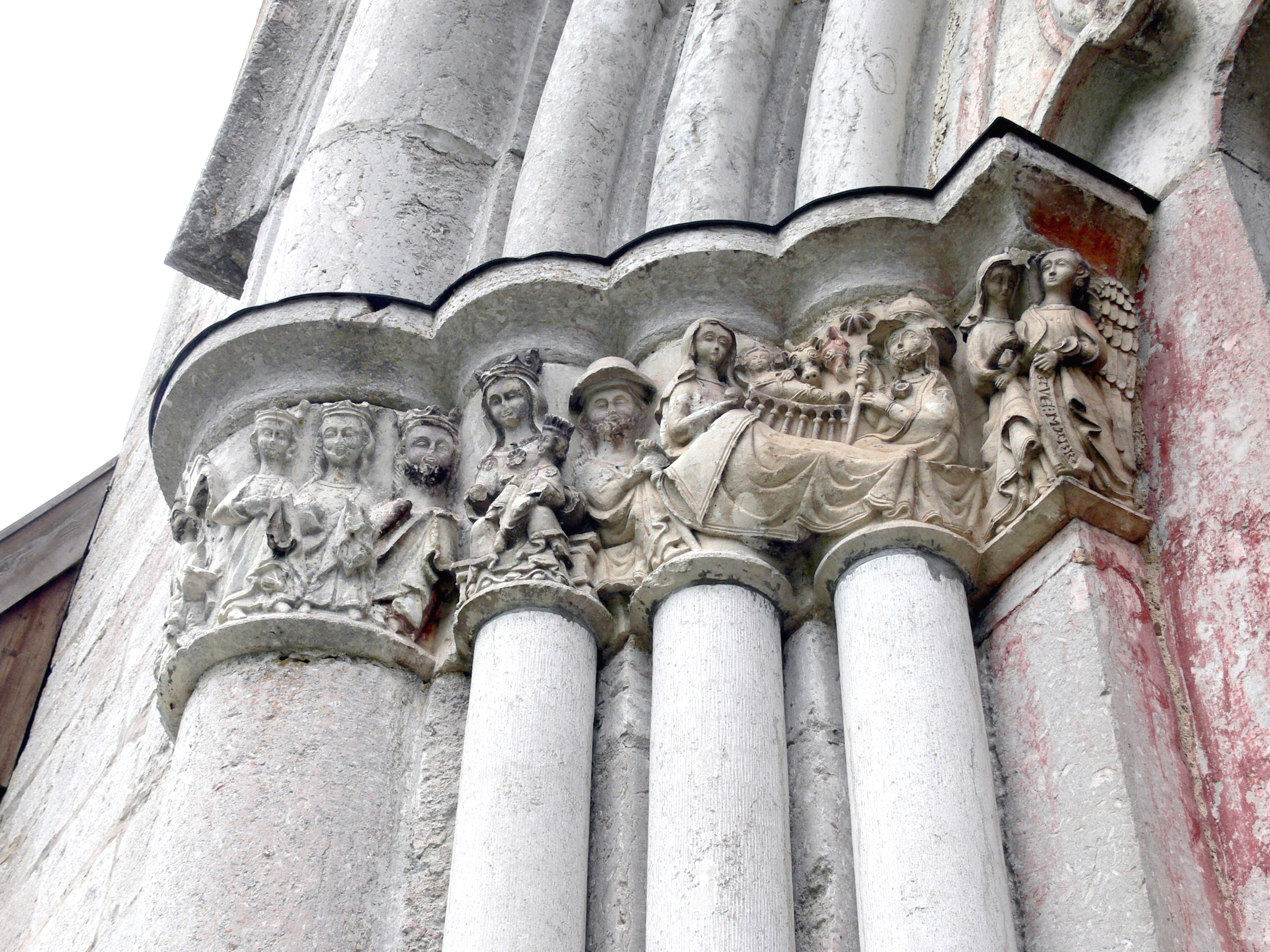
Entrance to Fole church.

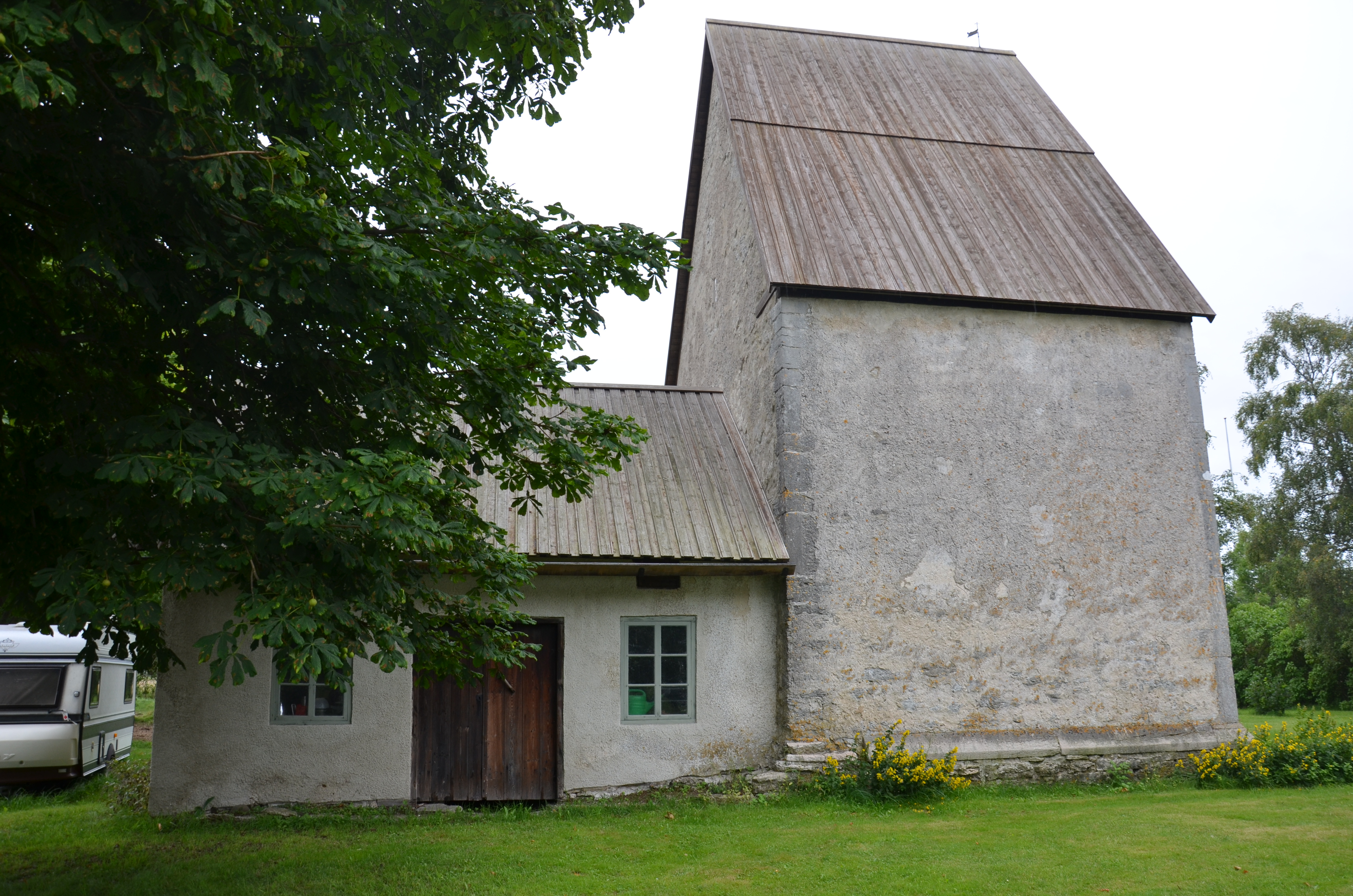
Medieval house Vtlings at Fole.

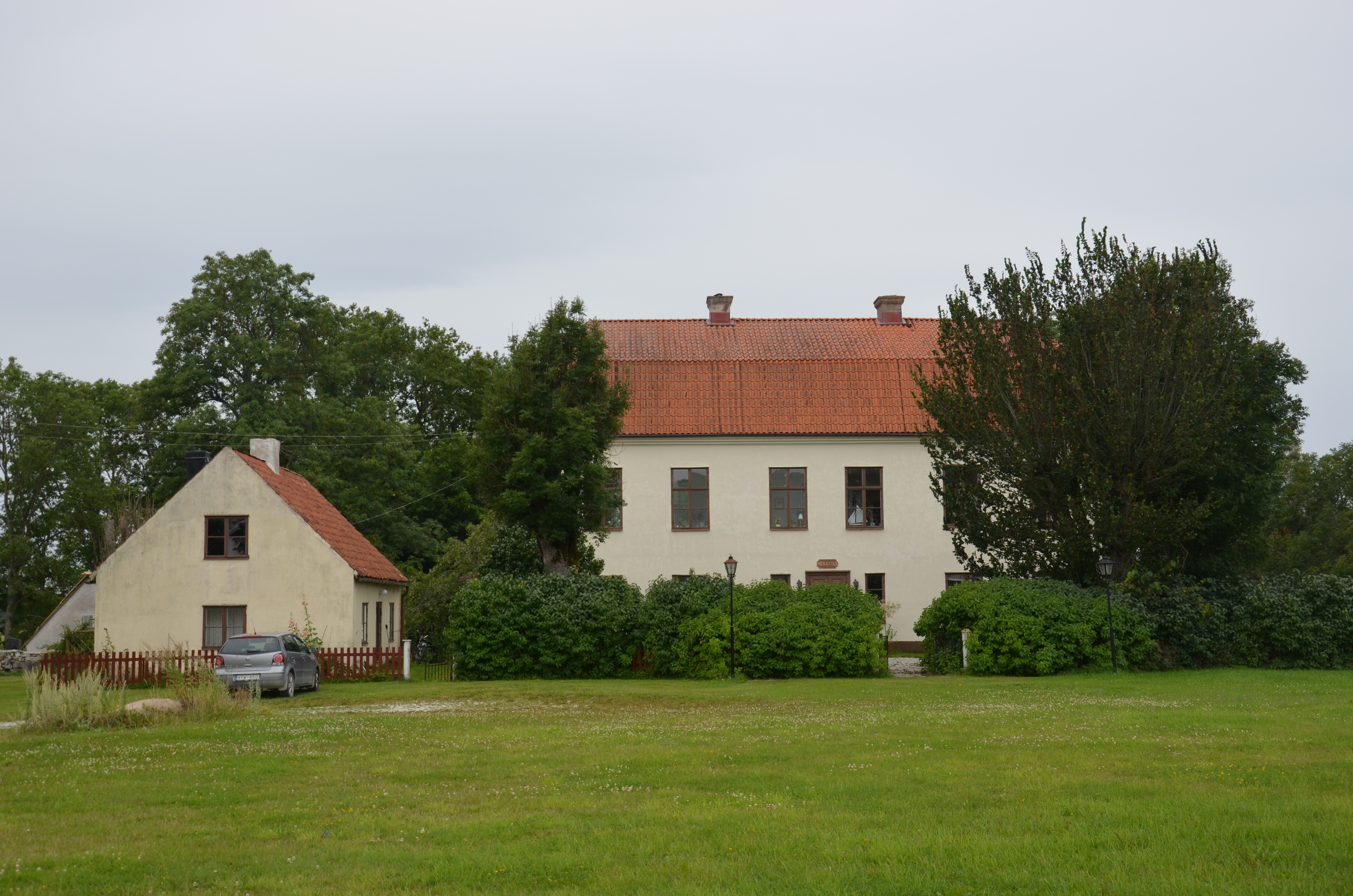
Fole rectory.
