= Barlingbo =

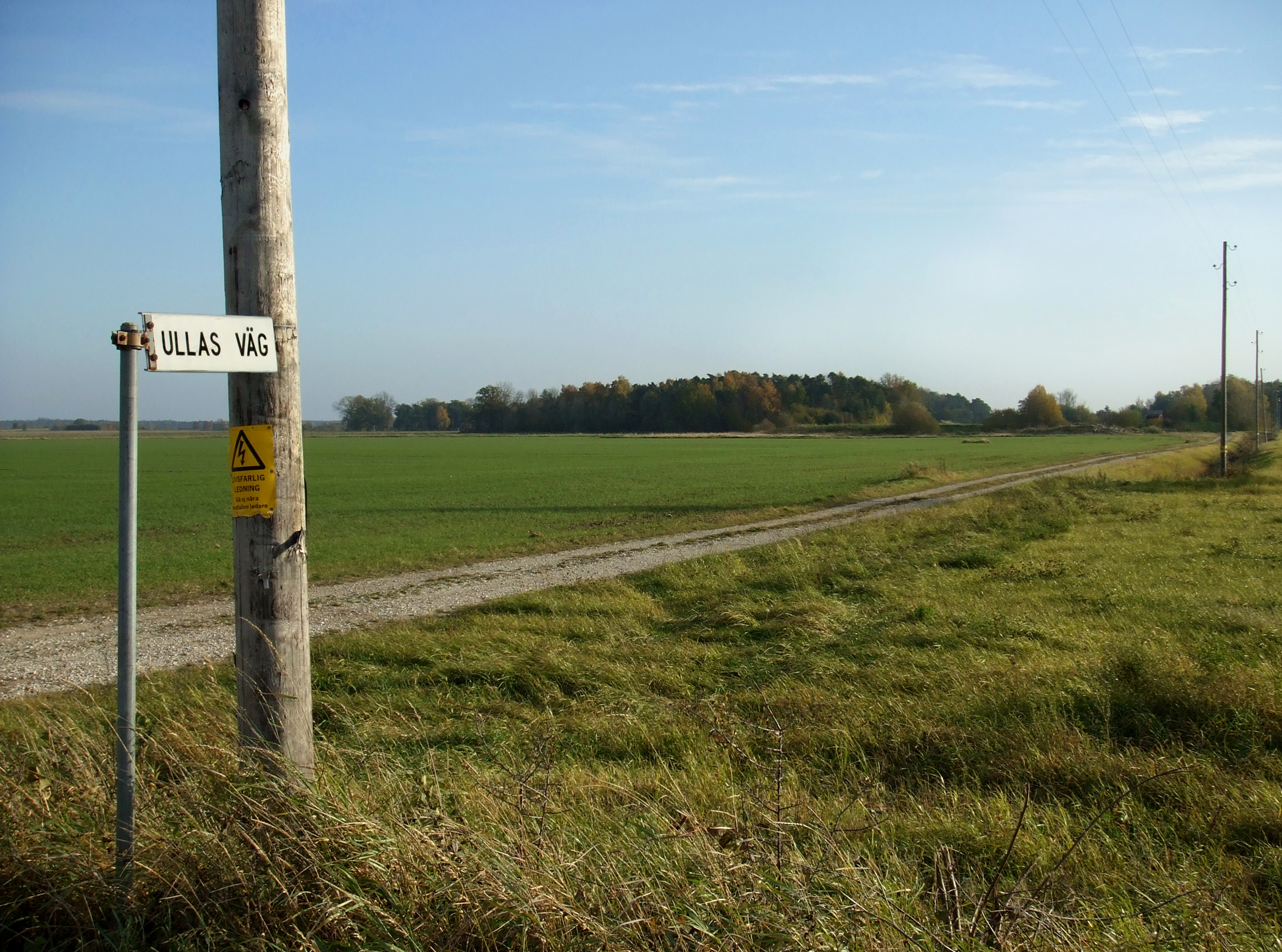
- Farmlands in Barlingbo

- Location within Gotland
- Coordinates: 57°33′52″N 18°27′47″E
- Country: Sweden
- Province: Gotland
- County: Gotland County
- Municipality: Gotland Municipality

Area
  - Total: 16.87 km^{2} (6.51 sq mi)

Population (2014)
  - Total: 265
- Time zone: UTC+1 (CET)
  - Summer (DST): UTC+2 (CEST)
- Website: www.barlingbosidan.se/barlingbo.htm

Barlingbo is a populated area, a socken (not to be confused with parish), on the Swedish island of Gotland. It comprises the same area as the administrative Barlingbo District, established on 1 January 2016. It is mostly known for the Stafva Manor, the largest cheese producer, and once one of the largest farms, on Gotland.

== Geography ==
Barlingbo is the name of the socken as well as the district. It is in the middle of the north part of Gotland. The land is flat and most of it is cultivated. The two mires, Stormyr and Lillmyr, have been drained and are now farmlands. The only forested areas are the east, north and west borders of the socken.

Barlingbo is also the name of the 0.22 km^{2} (0.085 mi^{2}) village surrounding the Barlingbo Church.(Barlingbo kyrka) As of 2019, Barlingbo Church belongs to Barlingbo parish in Romaklosters pastorat. The church belongs to the Church of Sweden and lies in the Diocese of Visby.

== Etymology ==
The name Barlingbo was first mentioned in 1380. It comes from bard, meaning "edge" or "ridge", and inge meaning "inhabitants". The last part, bo, means "settlement". This gives the meaning of Barlingbo as "the ridge people's settlement".

== History ==
Barlingbo dates back to Medieval times. It is the name of a larger area surrounding the medieval Barlingbo Church. It was originally part of the Endre thing, which in turn was in the northernmost of the three original districts (similar to ridings) that Gotland was divided into during the Middle Ages. In 1862, it became an independent municipality. In 1952, it was incorporated into the Romakloster municipality and in 1971, all of Gotland became one municipality. The boatswains from Barlingbo under the allotment system, were part of the First Gotlandic Boatswains Company.

There are 40 known Iron Age graves in Barlingbo. A Viking silver treasure has also been found.

== Stafva Manor ==
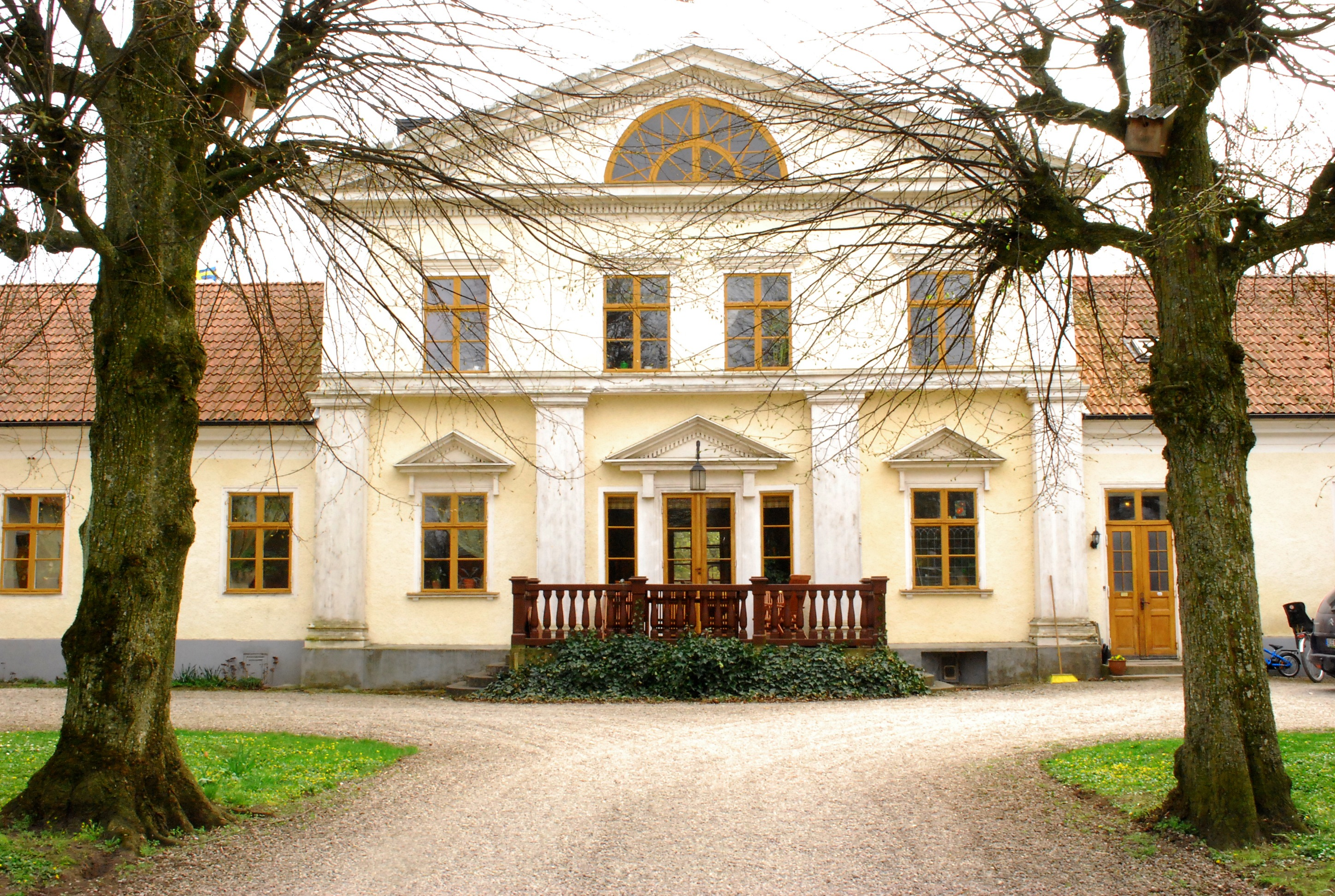
Stafva Manor

Stafva Manor (Stafva gård) was one of the largest farms on Gotland. It was bought in 1866, by Arthur von Corswant and has since been owned by that family for five generations. The main building was constructed by the former owner major J.E. Ahlgren by connecting two older stone buildings. In order to convert the land into farmland, Corswant felled most of the large oak groves in Barlingbo, something that caused much discontent among the inhabitants in the socken. His son, Willy von Corswant, was instrumental in the draining of the Roma and Stava mires, thereby creating even more farmland.

The manor is a working farm with cheese and meat production. Stafva is the largest cheese producer on Gotland. Three new stables for 1,200 beef cattle were inaugurated on 7 November 2007, by Minister of Agriculture Eskil Erlandsson.

The Stafva estate was originally 726 ha (1,790 acres), 512 ha (1,270 acres) of that area was farmland, 23 ha (57 acres) used for grazing and 159 ha (390 acres) was forested. In 2011, 650 ha (1,600 acres) of farmlands and forest as well as the stables, were sold. It became the largest property sale on Gotland ever, with a price of SEK 88 million.

Stafva has its own wind turbine. It was the first turbine bought by, and used on, a farm in Sweden. It is 40 m (130 ft) high, the rotation diameter of the turbine blades is 30 m (98 ft) and it was started in 1992. About 25% of the 300,000 kWh it produces each year, is used by Stafva estate. The rest of the electricity is sold to the Gotlands Energi AB (GEAB).
