= Väskinde =

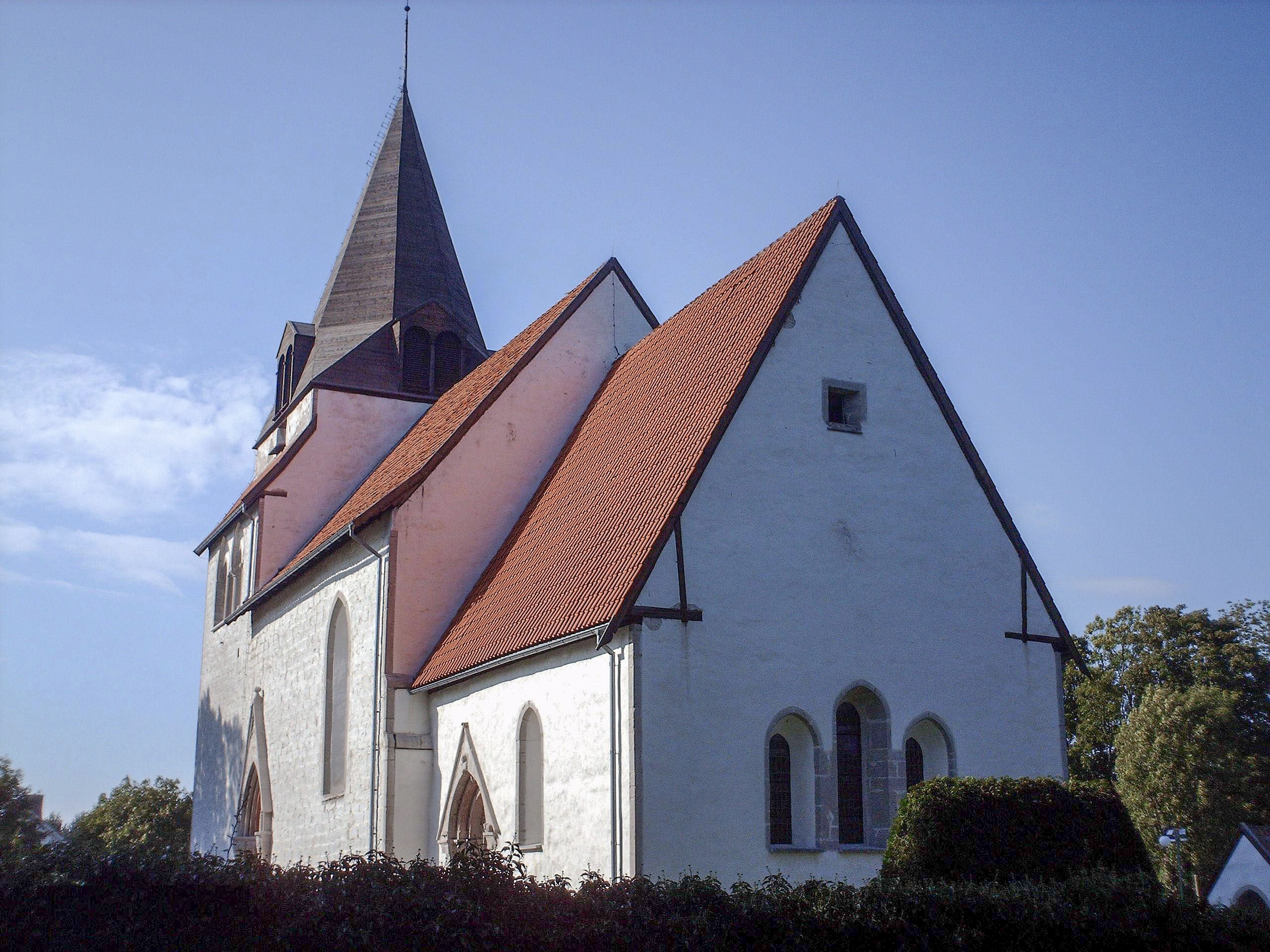
- Väskinde Church

- Location within Gotland
- Coordinates: 57°41′N 18°25′E
- Country: Sweden
- Province: Gotland
- County: Gotland County
- Municipality: Gotland Municipality

Area
  - Total: 0.40 km^{2} (0.15 sq mi)

Population (31 December 2014)
  - Total: 1,501
- Time zone: UTC+1 (CET)
  - Summer (DST): UTC+2 (CEST)

Väskinde (Swedish pronunciation: [ˈvɛ̂ɧːɪndɛ]) is a locality on the Swedish island of Gotland.

Väskinde is also the name of the larger populated area, socken (not to be confused with parish). It comprises the same area as the administrative Väskinde District, established on 1 January 2016.

== Geography ==
Väskinde is the name of the locality surrounding the medieval Väskinde Church, sometimes referred to as Väskinde kyrkby. It is also the name of the socken as well as the district. Väskinde is located in the northwest part of Gotland. As of 2019, Väskinde Church belongs to Väskinde parish in Norra Gotlands pastorat, along with the churches in Bro, Fole, Lokrume, Hejnum and Bäl.

At Själsö in the south part of the Väskinde socken coast, is Brucebo nature reserve and art museum. Formerly the home of artists William Blair Bruce and his wife Carolina Benedicks-Bruce, it is now managed by the Brucebo Foundation. Further north along the coast is Brissund fishing village and beach.

== Services ==
In Väskinde there is a school from kindergarten to sixth year of primary school with about 200 pupils from Väskinde, and nearby localities Lummelunda and Bro. The locality has an active Hembygdsförening or cultural association organising activities such as midsummer dance, and caring for local meadows. The public transport system services Väskinde with Bus 27, 61 and 62.
