= Passion Master =

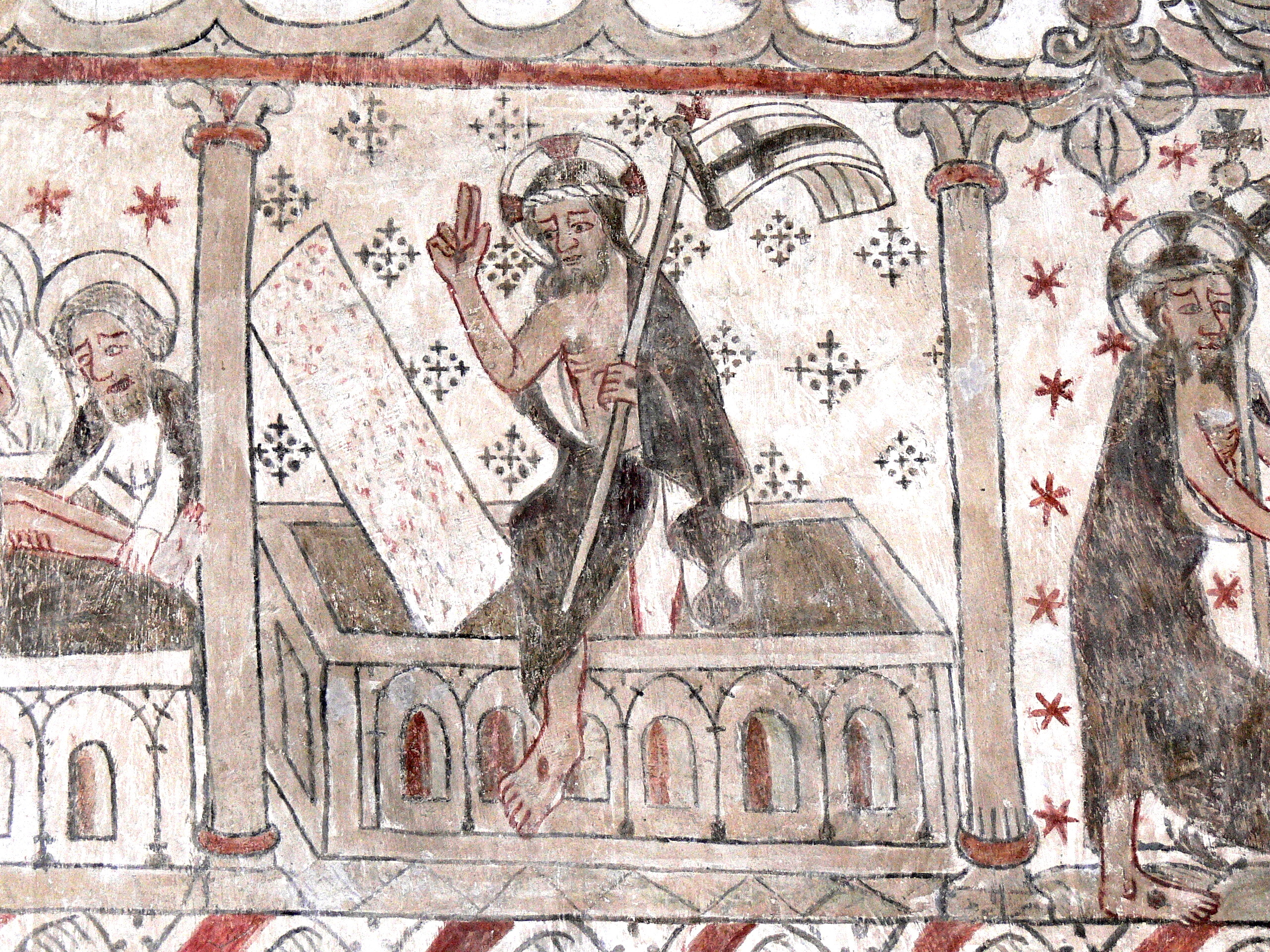
Fresco by The Master of the Passion of Christ in Öja Church, Gotland

The Passion Master (Swedish: Passionsmästaren) is the name used to refer to an anonymous fresco painter and his workshop, active on Gotland during the 15th century. Works in about fifty churches have been attributed to the artist. The style of the Master of the Passion of Christ has been described as schematic and even primitive.

Works identified as being by the artist can be found among others in Anga, Etelhem, Gammelgarn and Hörsne churches.

== See also ==
- Church frescos in Sweden
