= Torsburgen =

Hill fort in Sweden

- Tors borg or þors borg
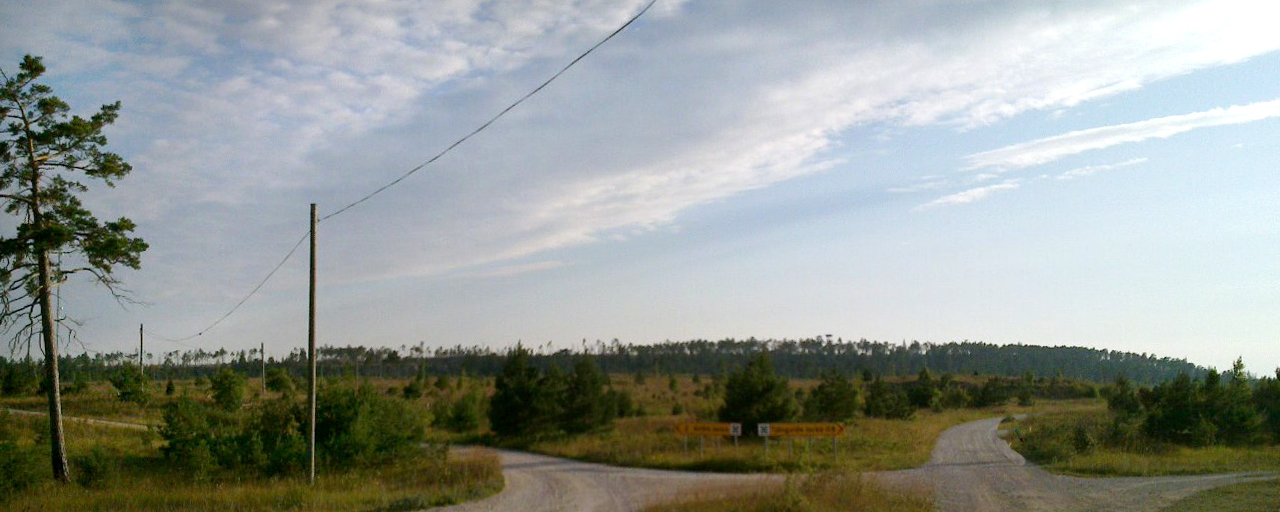
- The Torgburgen plateau hill from a distance

- Torsburgen location on Gotland
- 57°24′45″N 18°43′15″E
- Type: Hillfort
- Location: Kräklingbo, Gotland, Sweden
- Nearest city: Ljugarn

History
- Built: 1st-4th century

Site notes
- Elevation: 71 m (233 ft)
- Area: 1.2 km^{2} (0.46 mi^{2})
- Governing body: Gotland County

Torsburgen, Tors borg or þors borg ("Thor's fort/castle") are the remains of an ancient hillfort in Kräklingbo on the Swedish island of Gotland in the Baltic Sea. The fort is approximately 1.2 km^{2} (0.46 mi^{2}), was constructed in the 1st-4th century and in use until the 12th century. Situated on a plateau hill it is protected by high cliffs and wall sections, almost 2 km (1.2 mi) long in total. The fort is featured in the Gutasaga. The plateau is also a nature reserve.

== Geography ==
Torsburgen is situated on, and encompasses the whole of, an eponymous plateau hill in the central east part of Gotland. With 10–25 m (33–82 ft) steep cliffs in the west, north and east, it rises above the surrounding flat landscape. About 10,300–10,800 years ago it was a low island in the Baltic Ice Lake. The motions of that lake deposited gravel embankments in the southwest part of the plateau. Inside the embankments, now walls, has formed a small mire called Torsburgsmyr.

There are several caves in the cliffs along the northwest side, the deepest is the Burglädu (Gutnish for "Castle barn") at 16 m (52 ft). Another is Linnaeus' Cave, named after Carl Linnaeus who visited the hillfort in 1741. There is also the Rindarhulet. Rindi is Gutnish for ivy, a common plant on Gotland, and hulet means "the hole".

The hill and the surrounding area used to be covered with dense coniferous forest. Most of the forest was destroyed during the large Kräklingbo fire in the dry summer of 1992. Nevertheless, the area has given life to a wide variety of fire-dependent fungus, plants and insects, some of which are endangered species. Torsburgen has been ravaged by fires before. On his visit to the hill, Linnaeus noted that the plateau was almost void of trees. He was probably referring to the great fire of 1655, which ravaged the Alskog, Ala, Ardre and Kräklingbo sockens.

== History ==
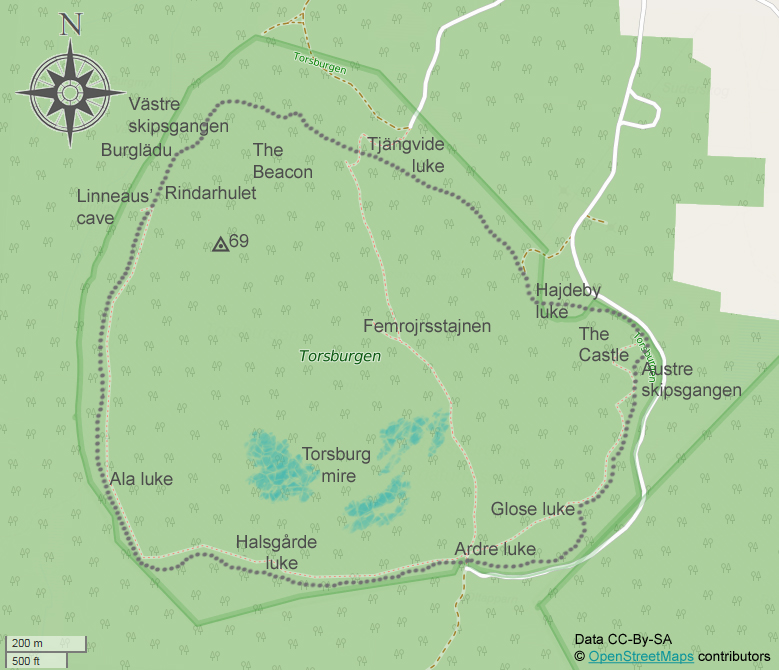
Map of Torsburgen

The hillfort was originally constructed at the beginning of the 1st century AD. Reinforced during the 4th century, it was in use until c. 1100 AD. Another source, based on an archaeological survey done in the 1970s, dates the two stages of constructing the fort to 300 AD and 900 AD. A timber-laced stone rampart encircled an area of 12 ha (30 acres). Scholars estimate that nearly 1000 soldiers would have been needed to defend it and it could have been providing refuge to the entire population of Gotland that is calculated to be between 6,000 and 10,000 in the early medieval period.

The fortification is approximately 1,300 m × 730 m–1,200 m (4,270 ft × 2,400 ft–3,940 ft) (E–W). The enclosed area on Torsburgen is about twice the size of the land enclose by the Visby city wall. The fort follows the natural edge of the plateau. The steep cliffs provide a natural protection for the hillfort in the west, north and east part of the plateau, with reinforcements and constructed walls in some places. In the northeast is a 40 m (130 ft) long wall made of large limestone blocks. The area is known as "The Castle" (Swedish: Slottet). In the southwest and south, the fort is protected by a 1.5 km (0.93 mi) long wall. The most western part of the wall is built of limestone slabs, while the southwest and south parts are made of limestone rubble and dirt. The wall is 4–7 m (13–23 ft) high and up to 24 m (79 ft) wide. On top of the wall was a palisade of logs. The limestone used for building the wall was quarried on site at a small quarry in the north part of the plateau. It has been estimated that the wall would take 3,000 men a year to build. Very little archaeological work has been done on Torsburgen, most of it is unexamined. Only four small metal objects have been retrieved during a minor excavation in connection to a restoration of the stone work at Ardre luke in 1983.

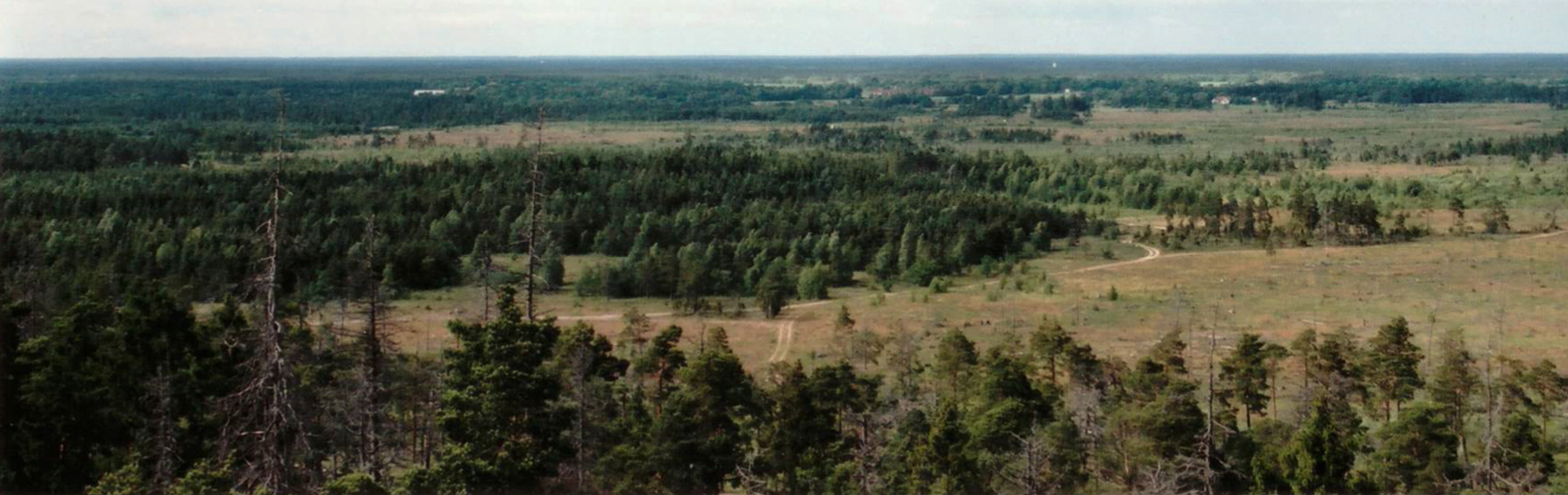
Northeast view from Torsburgen towards Katthammarsvik with the Baltic Sea in the distance.

There are several openings in the walls, in Gutnish called luke (Swedish: lucka), each with its own name:

- Tjängvide like
- Hajdeby luke
- Glose luke
- Ardre luke
- Halsgårde luke
- Ala luke

It has been suggested that Torsburgen was part of a defense system for lighting fire beacons on the many hill forts and plateau hills on the island, to warn the population about approaching enemy ships.

Torsburgen is the third largest fortified hill-fort in Scandinavia, with an area of 112.5 ha (1.125 km^{2}; 0.434 mi^{2}). It was most likely created during the Late Roman Iron Age (200 - 400 AD), the walls surrounding the area of the hillfort were made of dry stone, rubble from boulders, limestone, and a raised beach. While other hillforts in Sweden are described as vitrified, meaning the remains were turned to a glasslike substance by exposure to heat, Torburgen is a calcined hillfort, the remains of this site were reduced by roasting, leaving a different sort of rubble behind– it is sandy, almost black and strongly magnetic. In the latter case, the residue was a clayey to silty, yellowish brownish material. It is suggested that the walls of this fort were destroyed by fire from enemies.

The largest hillfort is Halleberg in Västergötland, Sweden at about 20 km^{2} (7.7 mi^{2}), and the second largest is Lollands Österborg on east Lolland, Denmark at about 5 km^{2} (1.9 mi^{2}). The fourth largest in Scandinavia and second largest on Gotland is the hillfort on Grogarnsberget.

=== Guta Saga ===
In the exodus story of the Guta Saga, the mythological history of Gotland, a third of Gotland's residents once temporarily settled themselves in Torsburgen after they were ordered by the local government to move due to overpopulation concerns. These residents were eventually forced to leave Gotland altogether; they subsequently settled in Fårö and Hiiumaa before finally moving through Russia to Greece, where they became the ancestors of the Goths.

== Nature reserve ==
In 1994, Torsburgen was designated as a nature reserve. The reserve comprises the whole plateau and the area immediately surrounding its base, which translates to 158 ha (390 acres). The flora includes a number of plants that are rare in Sweden, such as hard shield-ferns, scorpion senna, Orobanche alba and the Pulsatilla vulgaris gotlandica; all of which survived the fire in 1992. On 30 August 2005, the nature reserve became a Natura 2000 protected area. A number of endangered species of plants and insects on the IUCN Red List have been found within the area.

== Gallery ==
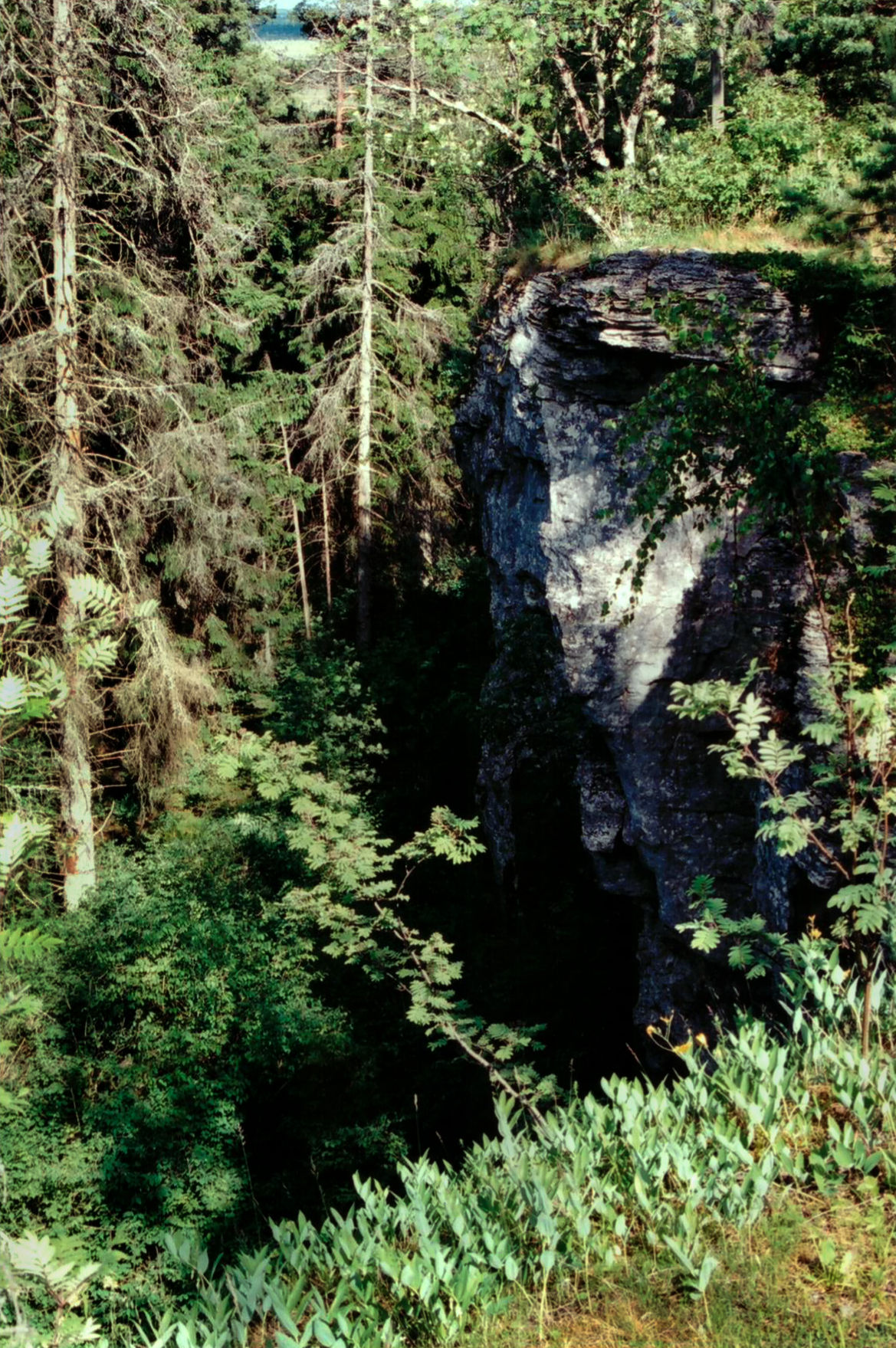
Cliffs in the north part beneath The Castle

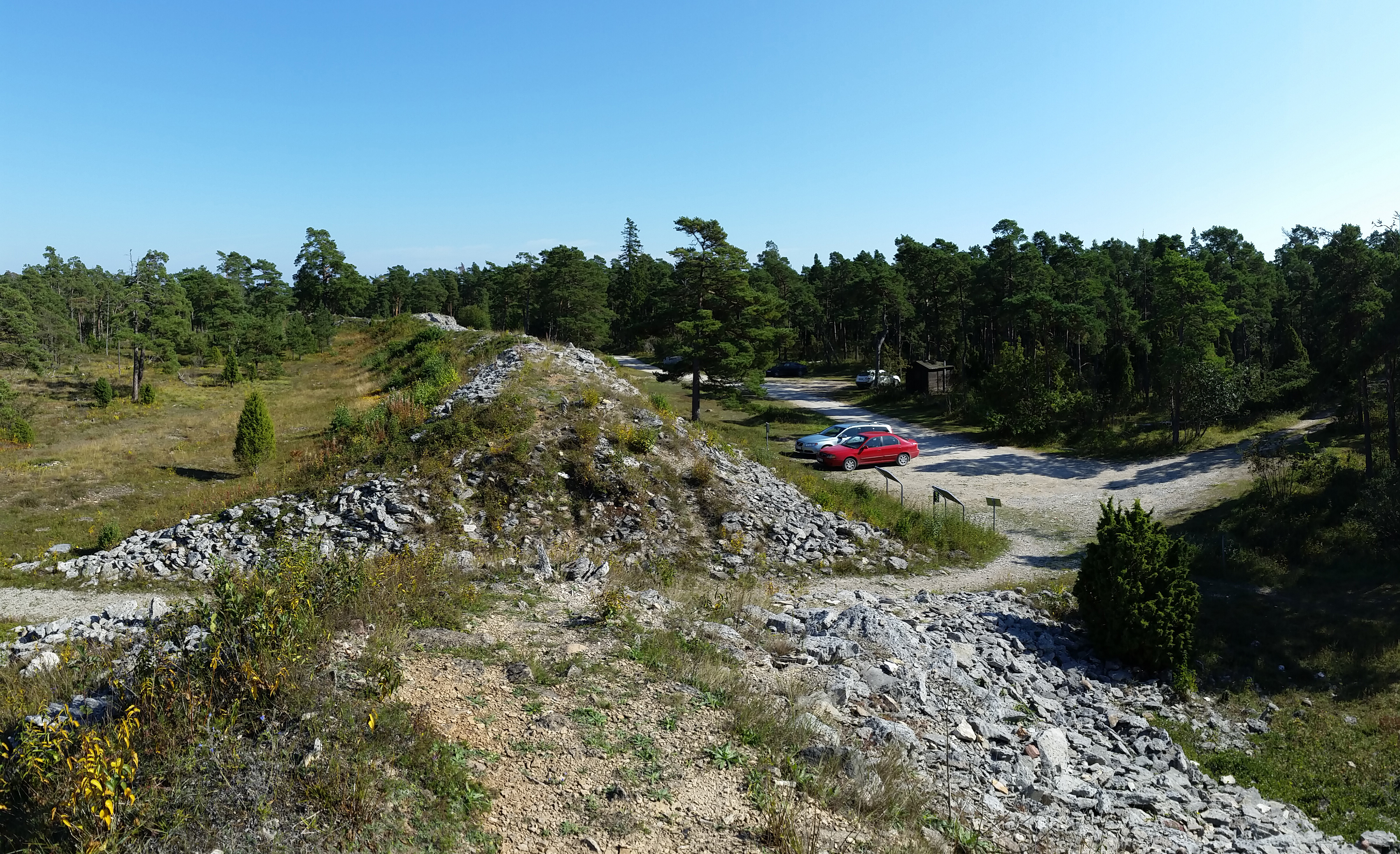
The walls at Ardre luke

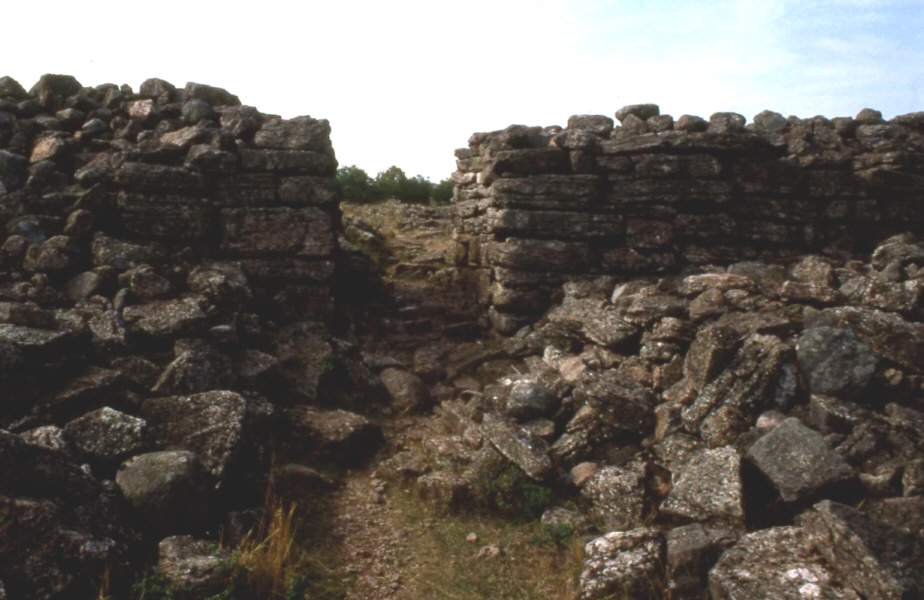
Part of the stone wall

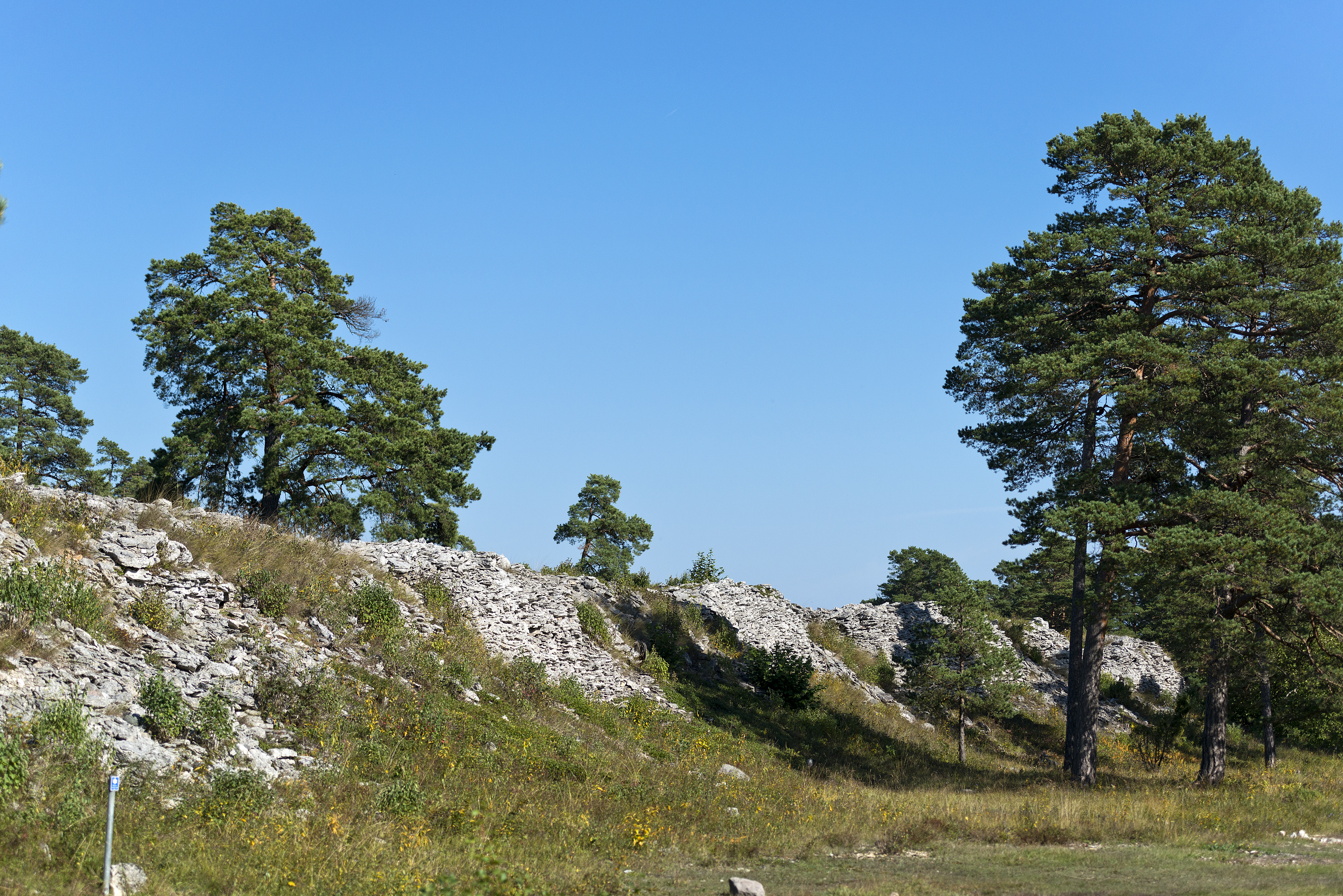
Part of the east wall

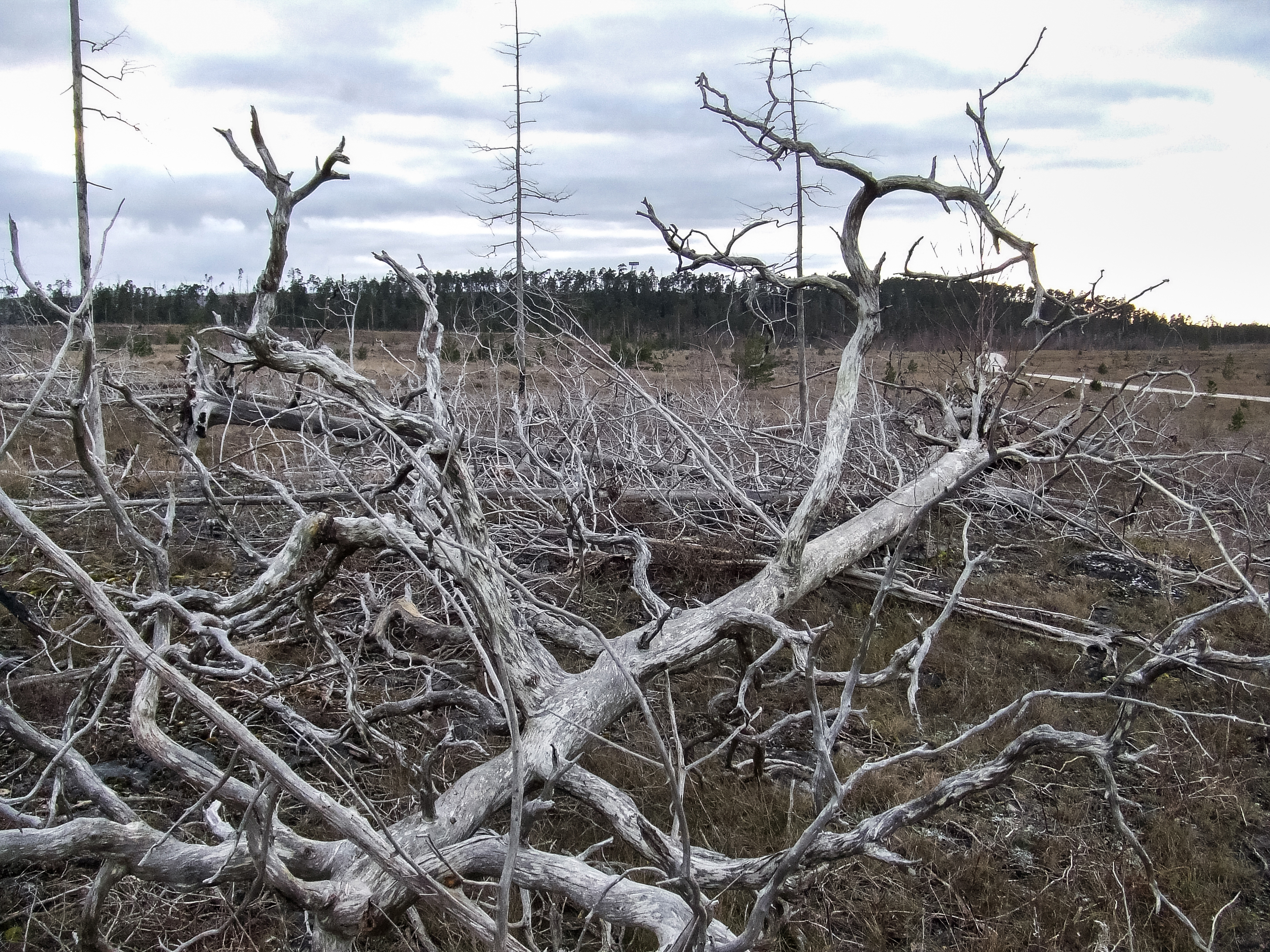
Torburgen seen from the land below the hill some years after the great fire
