= Ala Church =

- Ala kyrka
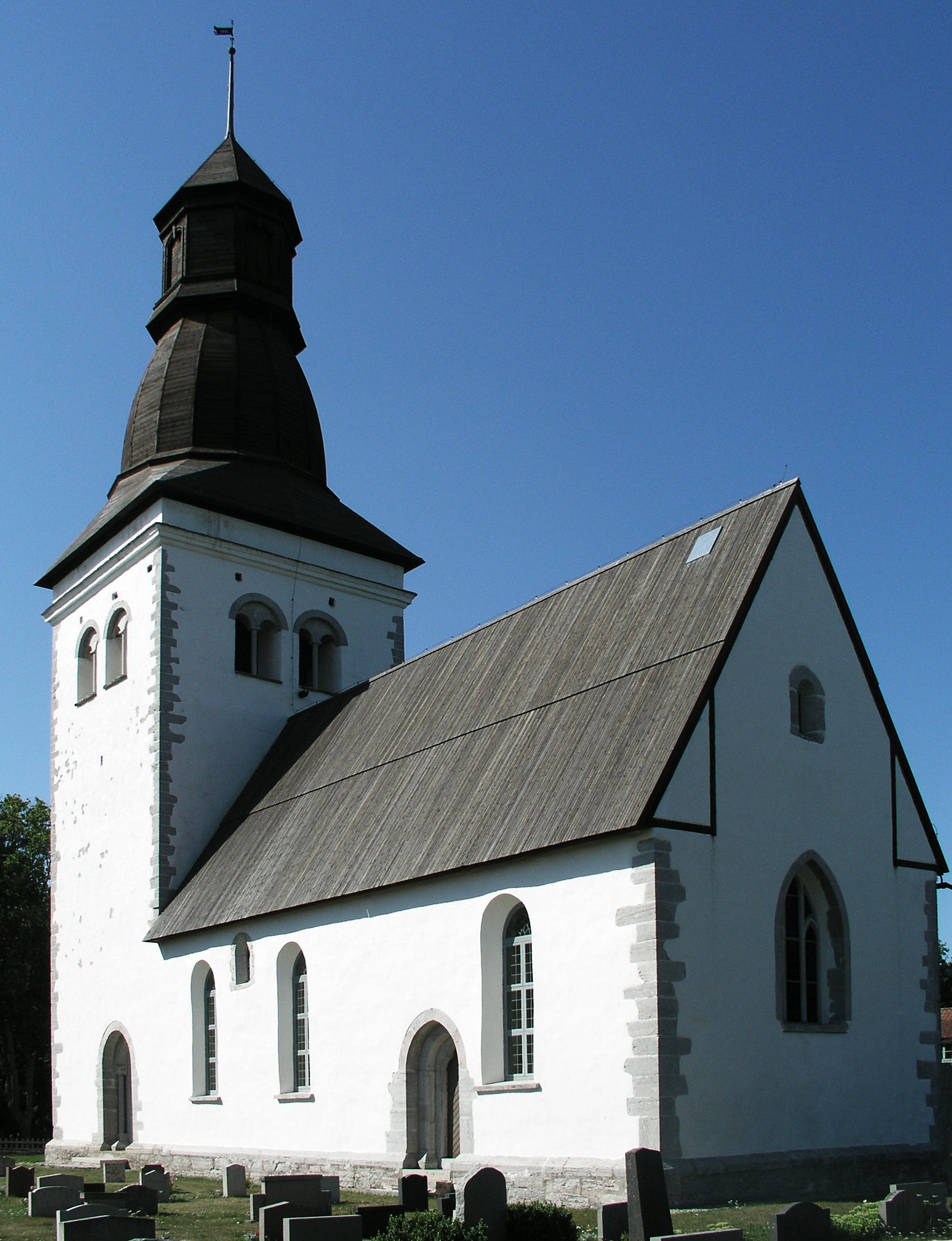
- Ala Church, view of the exterior

- Location on Gotland
- 57°25′08″N 18°38′07″E
- Country: Sweden
- Denomination: Church of Sweden
- Previous denomination: Catholic

Ala Church (Swedish: Ala kyrka) is a medieval church in Ala on the Swedish island of Gotland. Its oldest parts date from the 12th century. Damaged by fire in the 1930s, it still contains medieval murals and its original baptismal font. The church belongs to the Church of Sweden and lies within the Diocese of Visby.

== History and architecture ==
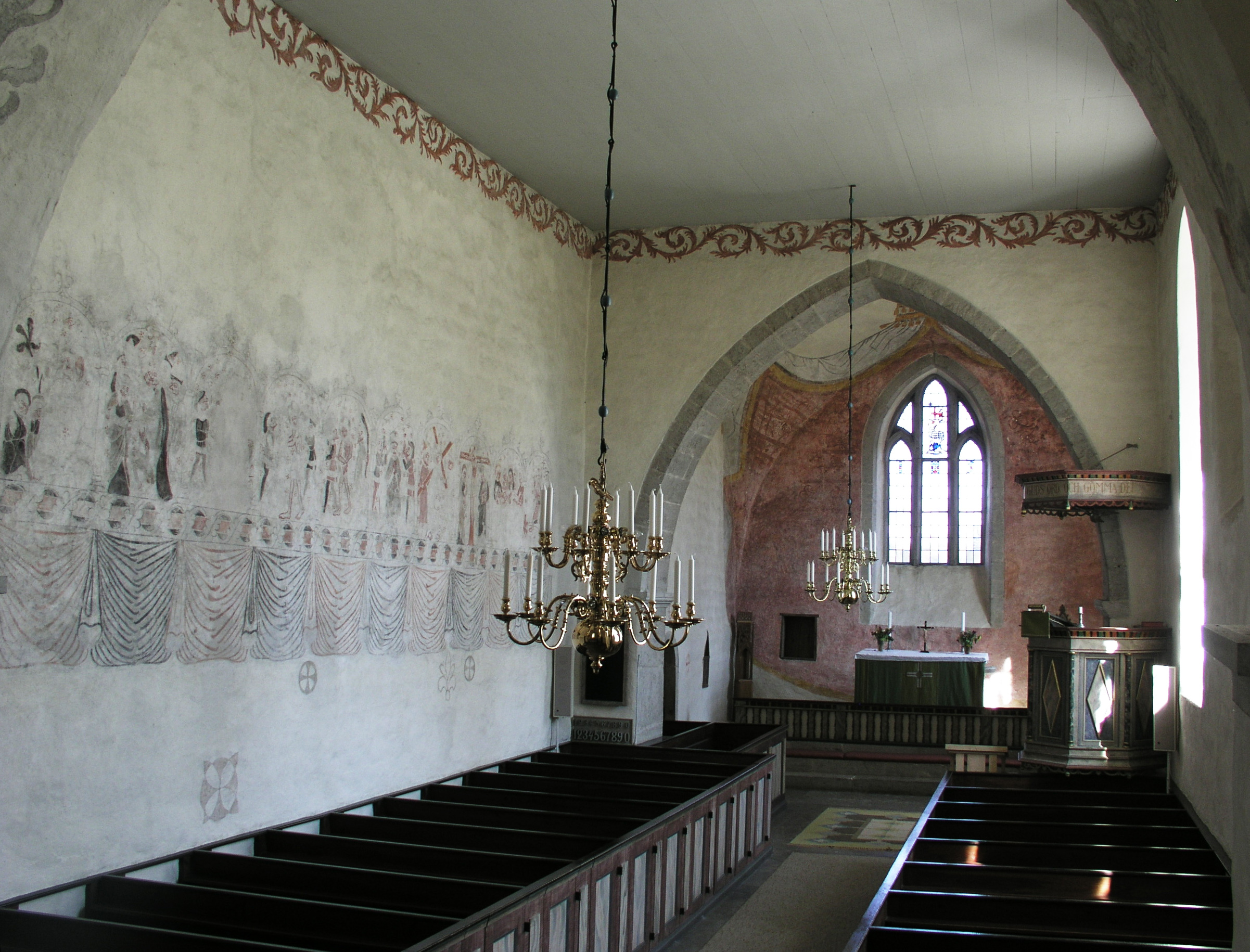
Interior view towards the choir

The oldest part of the aisleless church is the nave, erected during the 12th century. The choir was added during the middle of the 13th century, and replaced an earlier considerably smaller choir and apse. The presently visible church lacks an apse, typically for churches on Gotland, and instead has a straight eastern wall. The tower is slightly older than the choir. The southern portals of the church exhibit some unusual stone sculptures.

Inside, the church is decorated with medieval murals, consisting of two sets made separately at different times. The oldest date from the late 13th century and depict legendary animals and ornaments. The more recent date from the 15th century and depict a scene from the legend of Saint Martin, a large painting depicting the Passion of Christ made by the workshop of artist known as the Master of the Passion of Christ (Passionsmästaren) and other religious themes.

The church was heavily damaged by fire in 1938, and most of the furnishings, including a 13th-century triumphal cross, were destroyed. The medieval baptismal font from the 13th century is made of durable local limestone and was among the few items that survived. In 1938–1940, restoration work was carried out, and the church got a new organ in 1955.

Ala Church belongs to the Church of Sweden. It lies within the Diocese of Visby.
