= Östergarn =

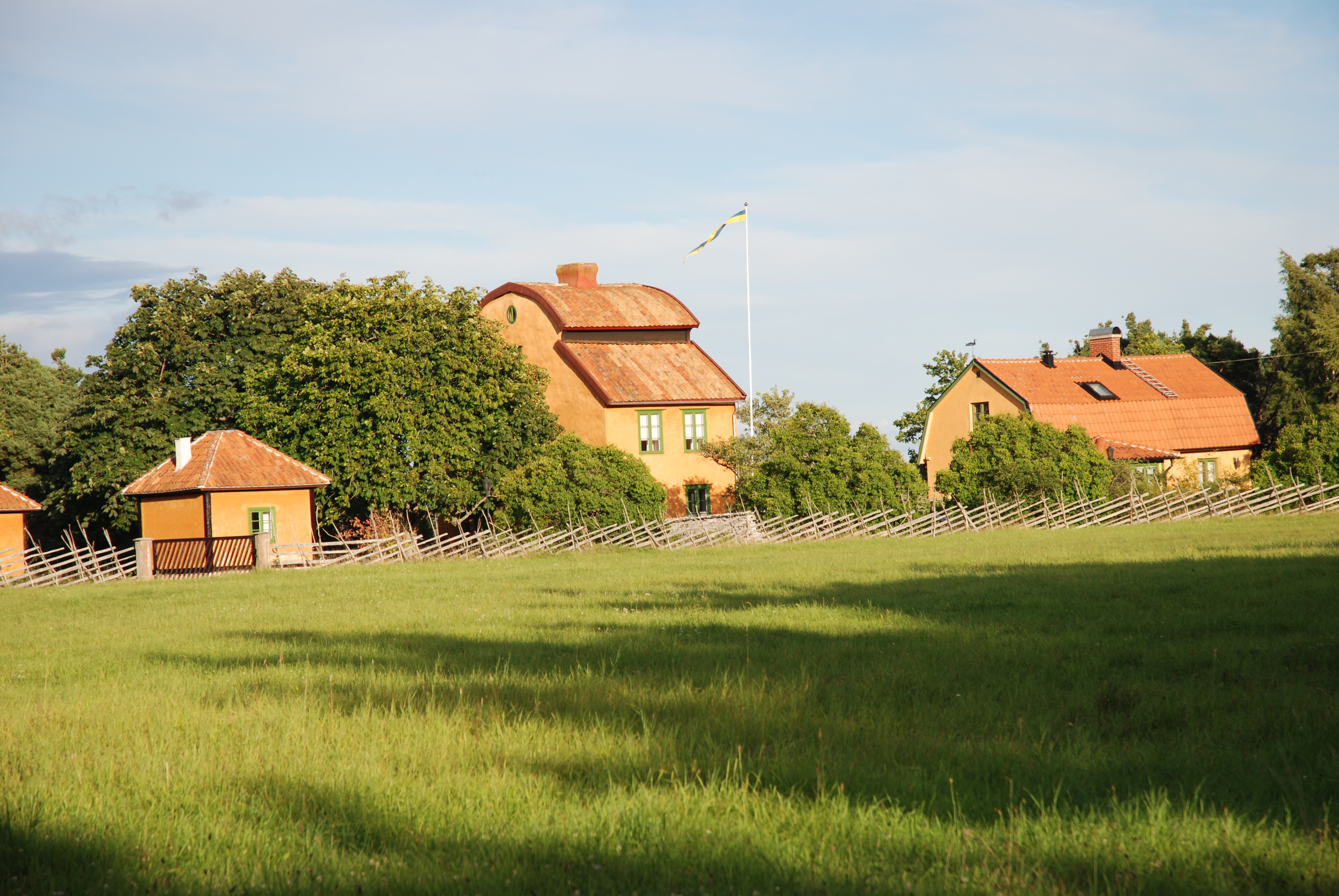
- Annas nöje, summer house in Katthammarsvik, Östergarn

- Location within Gotland
- Coordinates: 57°25′18″N 18°51′31″E
- Country: Sweden
- Province: Gotland
- County: Gotland County
- Municipality: Gotland Municipality

Area
  - Total: 28.29 km^{2} (10.92 sq mi)

Population (2014)
  - Total: 347
- Time zone: UTC+1 (CET)
  - Summer (DST): UTC+2 (CEST)
- Website: www.ostergarnslandet.com

Östergarn (Swedish pronunciation: [ˈœ̂sːtɛrˌɡɑːɳ]) is a populated area, a socken (not to be confused with parish), on the Swedish island of Gotland. It comprises the same area as the administrative Östergarn District, established on 1 January 2016.

== Geography ==
Östergarn is situated on a peninsula on the central part of eastern Gotland. The area has several low plateaus, the two major ones are Grogarnsberget and Östergarnsberget. The medieval Östergarn Church is located in the socken. As of 2019, Östergarn Church belongs to Östergarn parish in Romaklosters pastorat, along with the churches in Gammelgarn, Kräklingbo, Anga and Ala.

The harbor village Katthammarsvik is on the north coast of Östergarn and the Herrvik fishing village is on the eastern tip of the peninsula. About 4 km (2.5 mi) northeast of Herrvik is the Östergarnsholm island with its two lighthouses. The island is about 200 ha (490 acres). Along the southern coast is the Sandviken Natura 2000 nature reserve with its long, sandy beach.

One of the asteroids in the asteroid belt, 10815 Östergarn, is named after this place.

=== Climate ===
Climate data for Östergarnsholm (2015–2020 averages; extremes since 1901)
Month	Jan	Feb	Mar	Apr	May	Jun	Jul	Aug	Sep	Oct	Nov	Dec	Year
Mean maximum °C (°F)	5.6 (42.1)	5.1 (41.2)	9.0 (48.2)	14.6 (58.3)	21.3 (70.3)	23.3 (73.9)	26.1 (79.0)	24.8 (76.6)	20.2 (68.4)	15.3 (59.5)	10.3 (50.5)	7.2 (45.0)	26.9 (80.4)
Mean daily maximum °C (°F)	3.3 (37.9)	3.7 (38.7)	5.3 (41.5)	8.6 (47.5)	13.3 (55.9)	18.3 (64.9)	20.8 (69.4)	21.1 (70.0)	17.8 (64.0)	11.6 (52.9)	8.5 (47.3)	5.4 (41.7)	11.3 (52.3)
Daily mean °C (°F)	1.5 (34.7)	2.0 (35.6)	2.8 (37.0)	5.5 (41.9)	10.0 (50.0)	14.9 (58.8)	17.6 (63.7)	18.1 (64.6)	14.9 (58.8)	9.8 (49.6)	6.2 (43.2)	4.0 (39.2)	9.0 (48.2)
Mean daily minimum °C (°F)	0.2 (32.4)	0.7 (33.3)	0.6 (33.1)	2.6 (36.7)	6.8 (44.2)	11.8 (53.2)	15.0 (59.0)	15.6 (60.1)	12.8 (55.0)	8.2 (46.8)	4.9 (40.8)	2.6 (36.7)	7.0 (44.6)
Average precipitation mm (inches)	42.0 (1.65)	28.5 (1.12)	27.0 (1.06)	20.5 (0.81)	26.2 (1.03)	38.6 (1.52)	74.4 (2.93)	52.8 (2.08)	31.4 (1.24)	54.1 (2.13)	58.9 (2.32)	46.2 (1.82)	500.6 (19.71)
Mean monthly sunshine hours	38.6	68.4	164.5	247.4	318.3	323.9	303.5	270.5	198.6	115.4	51.5	36.5	2,137.1
Source 1: SMHI
Source 2: SMHI Monthly Data 2015–2020
