= Gammelgarn =

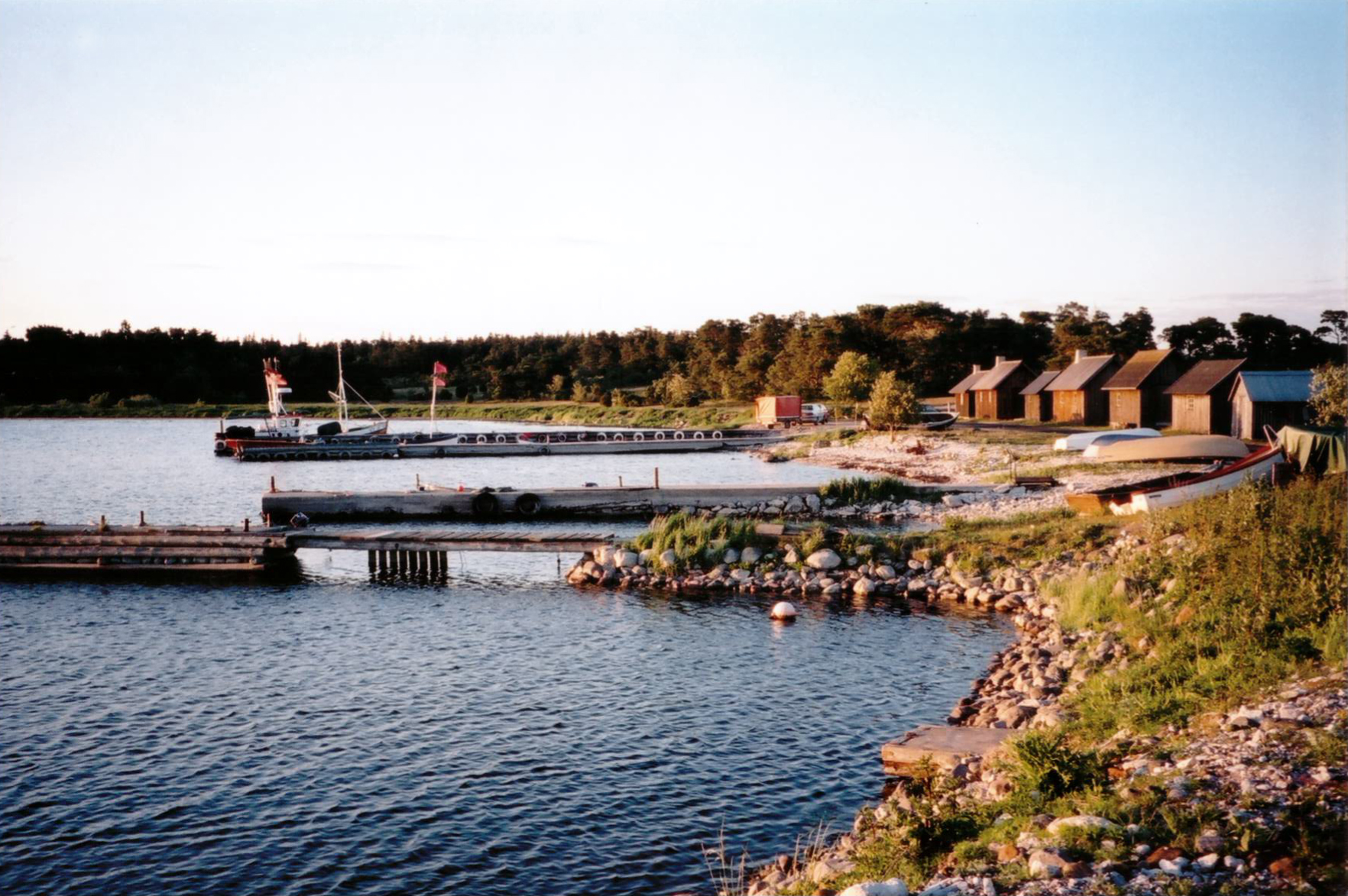
- Sjauster in Gammelgarn

- Location within Gotland
- Coordinates: 57°24′16″N 18°48′16″E
- Country: Sweden
- Province: Gotland
- County: Gotland County
- Municipality: Gotland Municipality

Area
  - Total: 38.20 km^{2} (14.75 sq mi)

Population (2014)
  - Total: 187
- Time zone: UTC+1 (CET)
  - Summer (DST): UTC+2 (CEST)

Gammelgarn is a populated area, a socken (not to be confused with parish), on the Swedish island of Gotland. It comprises the same area as the administrative Gammelgarn District, established on 1 January 2016.

== Geography ==
Gammelgarn is situated in the central east part of Gotland. The medieval Gammelgarn Church is located in the socken. On the south shore of Gammelgarn are the fishing villages of Grynge and Sjauster (or Sjaustru), the latter with a long sandy beach.

As of 2019, Gammelgarn Church belongs to Östergarn parish in Romaklosters pastorat, along with the churches in Östergarn, Kräklingbo, Anga and Ala.

== See also ==
- The great forest fire in Kräklingbo
