= Anga, Gotland =

Anga
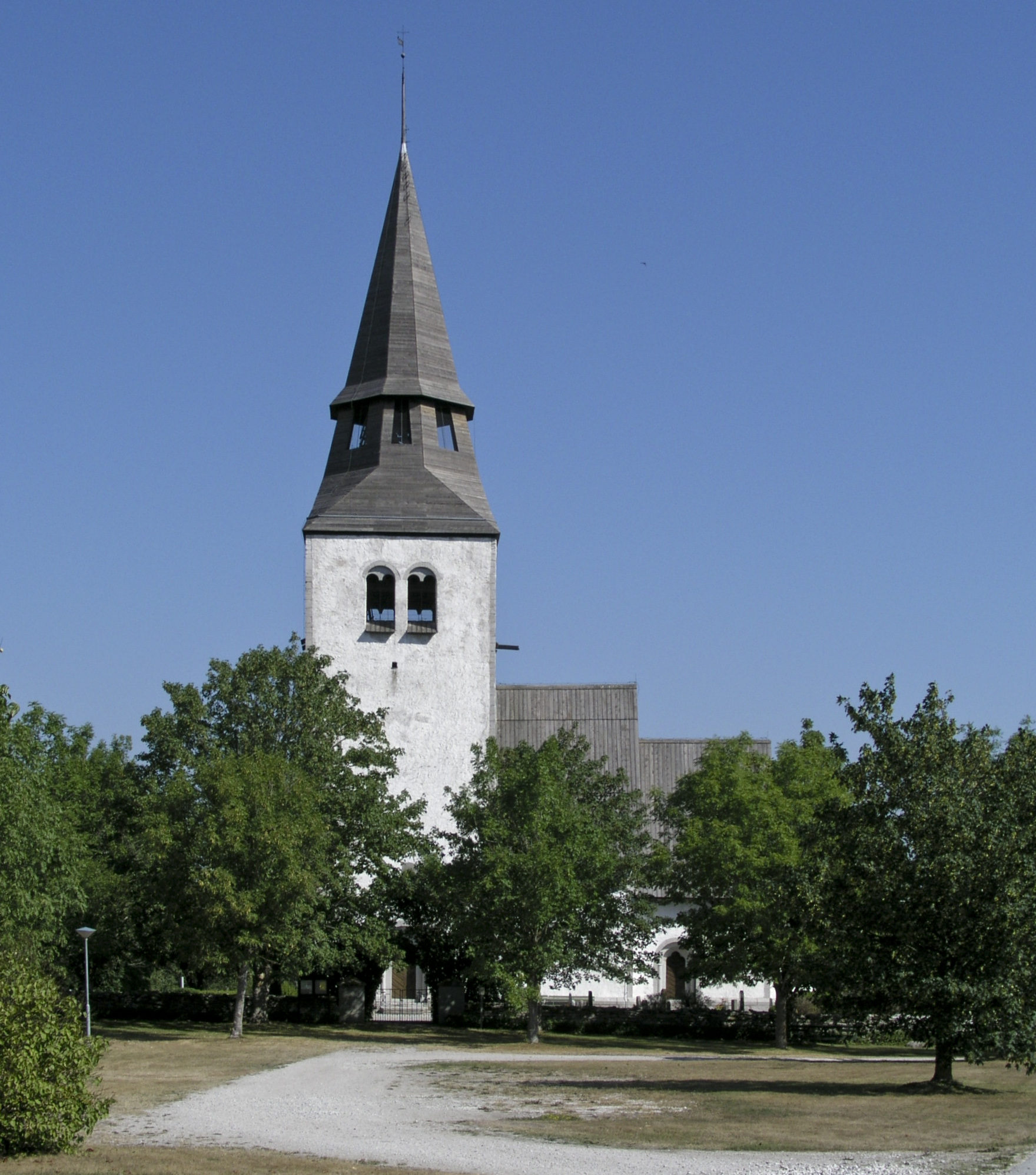
- Anga Church

- Location within Gotland
- Coordinates: 57°28′49″N 18°42′23″E
- Country: Sweden
- Province: Gotland
- County: Gotland County
- Municipality: Gotland Municipality

Area
  - Total: 30.49 km^{2} (11.77 sq mi)

Population (2014)
  - Total: 98
- Time zone: UTC+1 (CET)
  - Summer (DST): UTC+2 (CEST)

Anga is a populated area, a socken (not to be confused with parish), on the Swedish island of Gotland. It comprises the same area as the administrative Anga District, established on 1 January 2016.

Anga is mostly known for the intact graves in Trullhalsar grave field dating from the Vendel Period and the Viking Age.

== Geography ==
Anga is situated in the central east coast of Gotland. The medieval Anga Church is located in the socken. As of 2019, Anga Church belongs to Östergarn parish in Romaklosters pastorat, along with the churches in Östergarn, Gammelgarn, Kräklingbo and Ala.
