= Kräklingbo Church =

- Kräklingbo kyrka
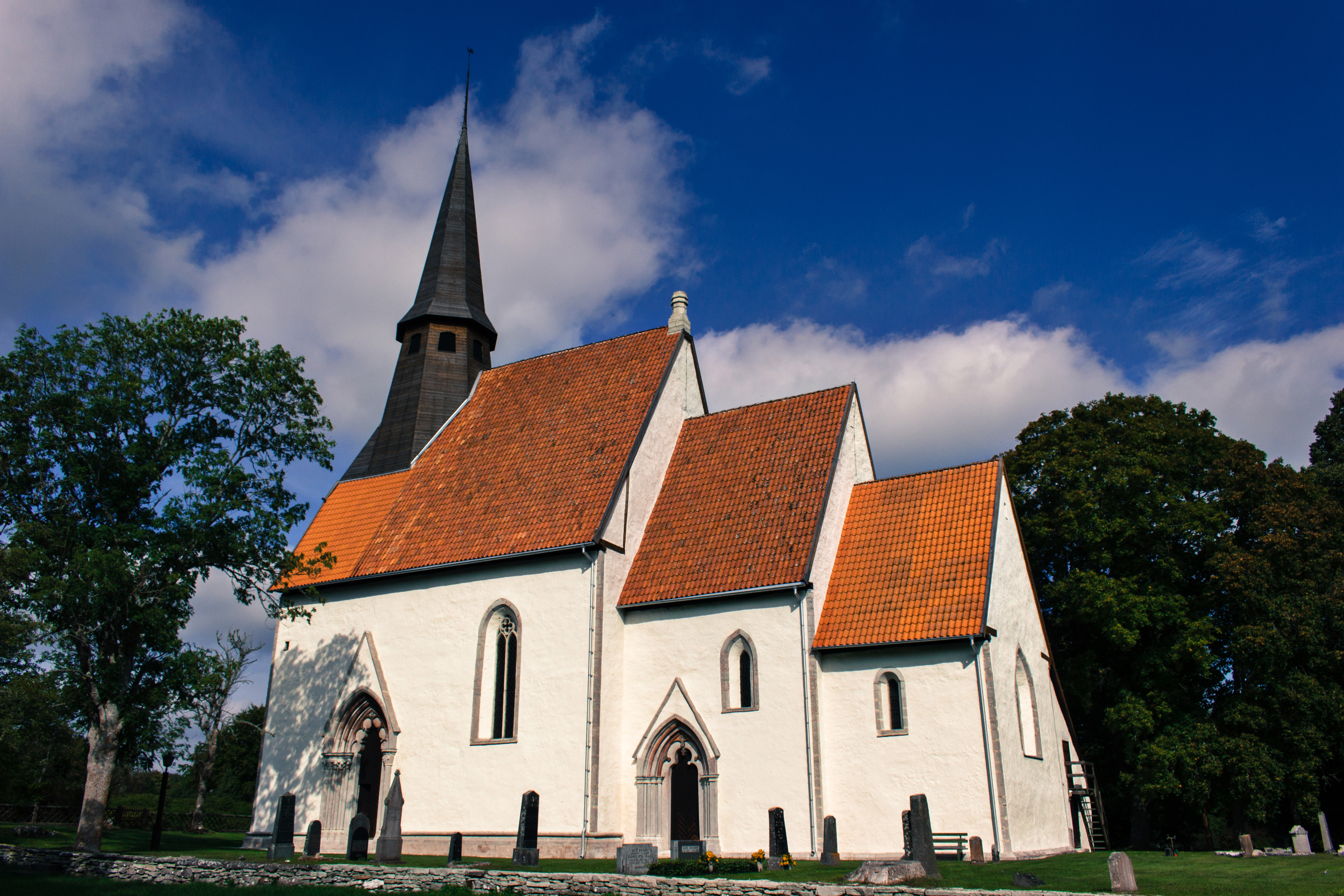
- Kräklingbo Church, view of the exterior

- Location on Gotland
- 57°26′43″N 18°42′41″E
- Country: Sweden
- Denomination: Church of Sweden

Kräklingbo Church (Swedish: Kräklingbo kyrka) is a medieval church in Kräklingbo on the Swedish island of Gotland. It belongs to the Diocese of Visby.

== History and architecture ==
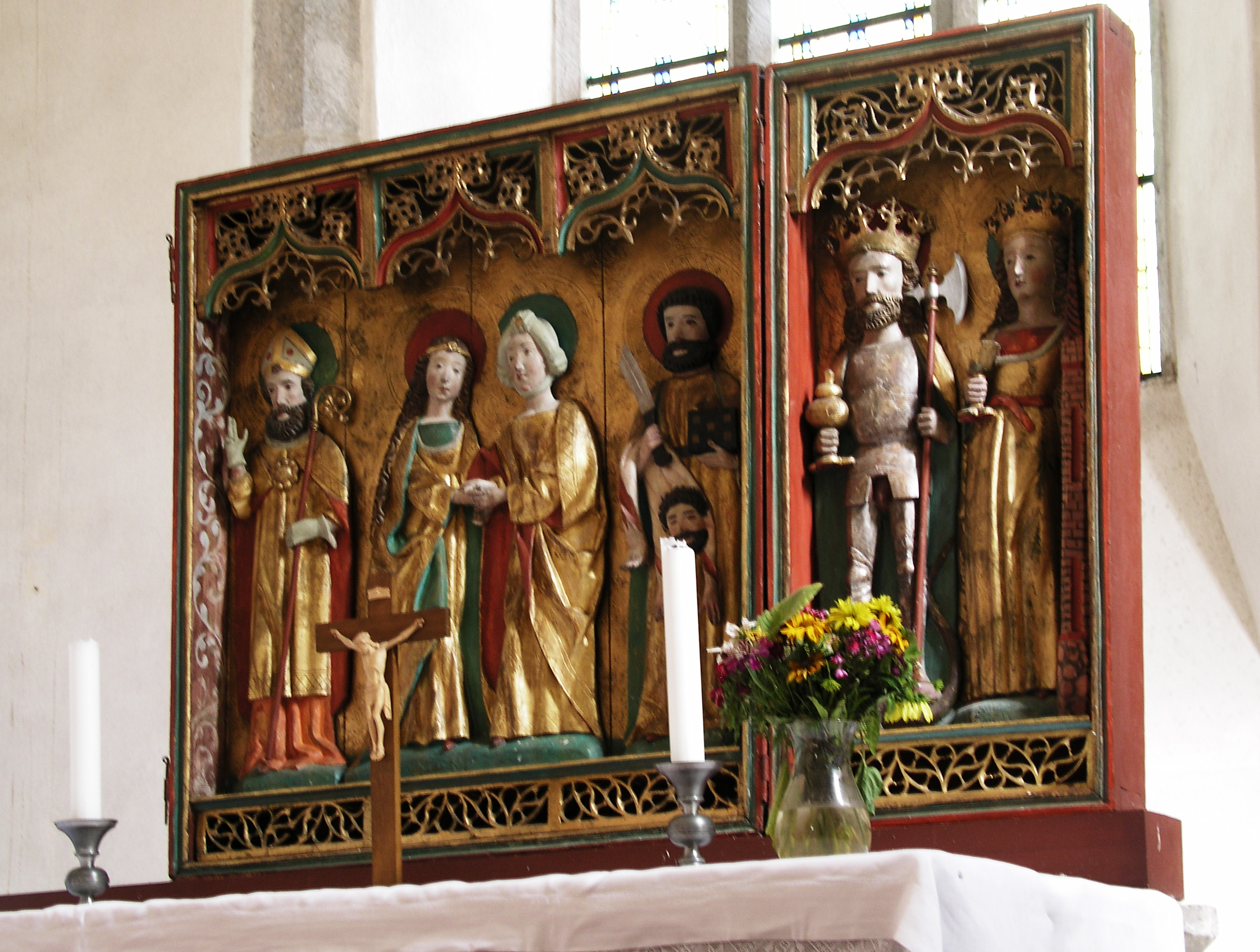
The altarpiece (early 16th century)

The choir and its apse-like projection to the east are the oldest parts of Kräklingbo Church. This part of the church originally formed the nave and choir of an earlier church; an inscription mentions its inauguration in 1211. The present nave and sacristy were built around 1300, and thus incorporated these earlier elements. The east window in the apse-like projection dates from the reconstruction circa 1300. The two main portals of the church also date from this later building period. They are richly decorated with sculptures depicting religious motifs and ornamentation. A proper church tower was never built; the spire probably dates from the 18th century but was remade during a renovation in 1908.

Inside, the church is decorated with murals. Most of these date from the early 13th century and depict religious scenes. During the reconstruction of the church around 1300, some of the murals were damaged. Three scenes were furthermore added in 1908. The church has also been decorated internally by the use of alternating stones of different colours in many of the details such as the window frames.

The church houses a number of medieval items. The altarpiece was manufactured on Gotland at the beginning of the 16th century. The triumphal cross is older, from the end of the 13th century, and is still in the Romanesque tradition. The choir benches, lastly, date from the 14th century. The baptismal font and the unusual pulpit are both from the second half of the 17th century, and Baroque in style.
