= Grogarnsberget =

Protected area in Östergarn, Sweden

- Grogranshuvud
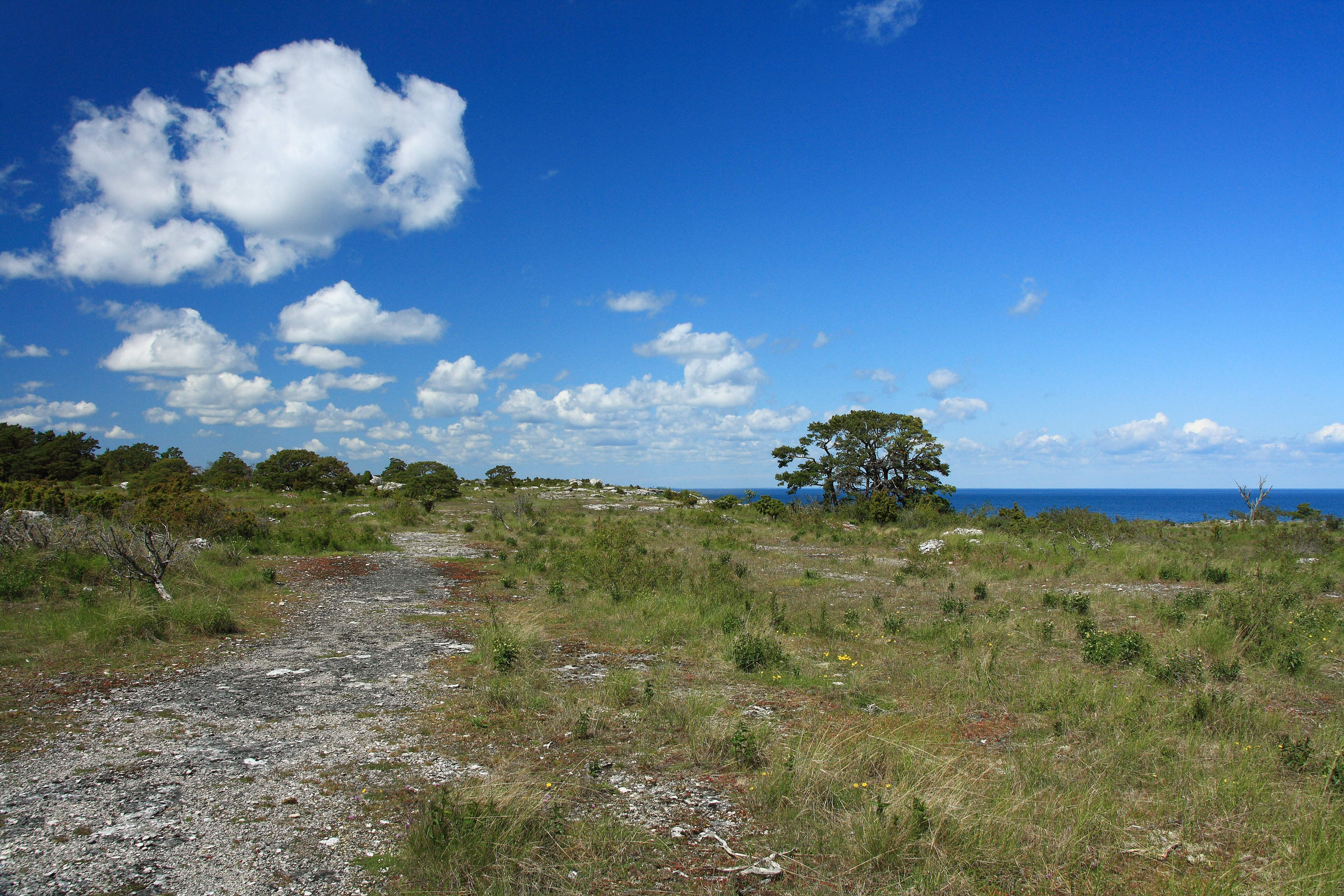
- Grogarnsberget plateau

Highest point
- Elevation: 30 m (98 ft)
- Coordinates: 57°26′34.4″N 18°53′22.4″E

Geography
- Location within Gotland
- Location: Östergarn, Gotland, Sweden
- Parent range: Part of the Fröjel Formation

Geology
- Rock age(s): Homerian (late Wenlock, mid Silurian)
- Mountain type: Carbonate platform plateau

Grogarnsberget or Grogarnsberg (lit. "The Grogarn Mountain" more appropriate "Grogarn Hill") is a plateau hill on the Östergarn coast, on the Swedish island of Gotland. On the hill are the remains of former hillfort, the second largest on Gotland and the fourth largest in Scandinavia.

== Geography ==
The hill is on the northeast coast of the most eastern part of Gotland. It is approximately 30 m (98 ft) high with steep cliffs on three sides. The hill provides a good view of Östergarnsholm with its two lighthouses. In the west, east and south are the historic harbors Katthammarsvik, Herrvik, and Sandviken, formerly starting points for journeys across the Baltic Sea to the Baltic.

The Grogarnsberget is also a nature reserve and it is designated a Natura 2000 area. Established in 2007, it covers 252 ha (620 acres).

== Hillfort ==
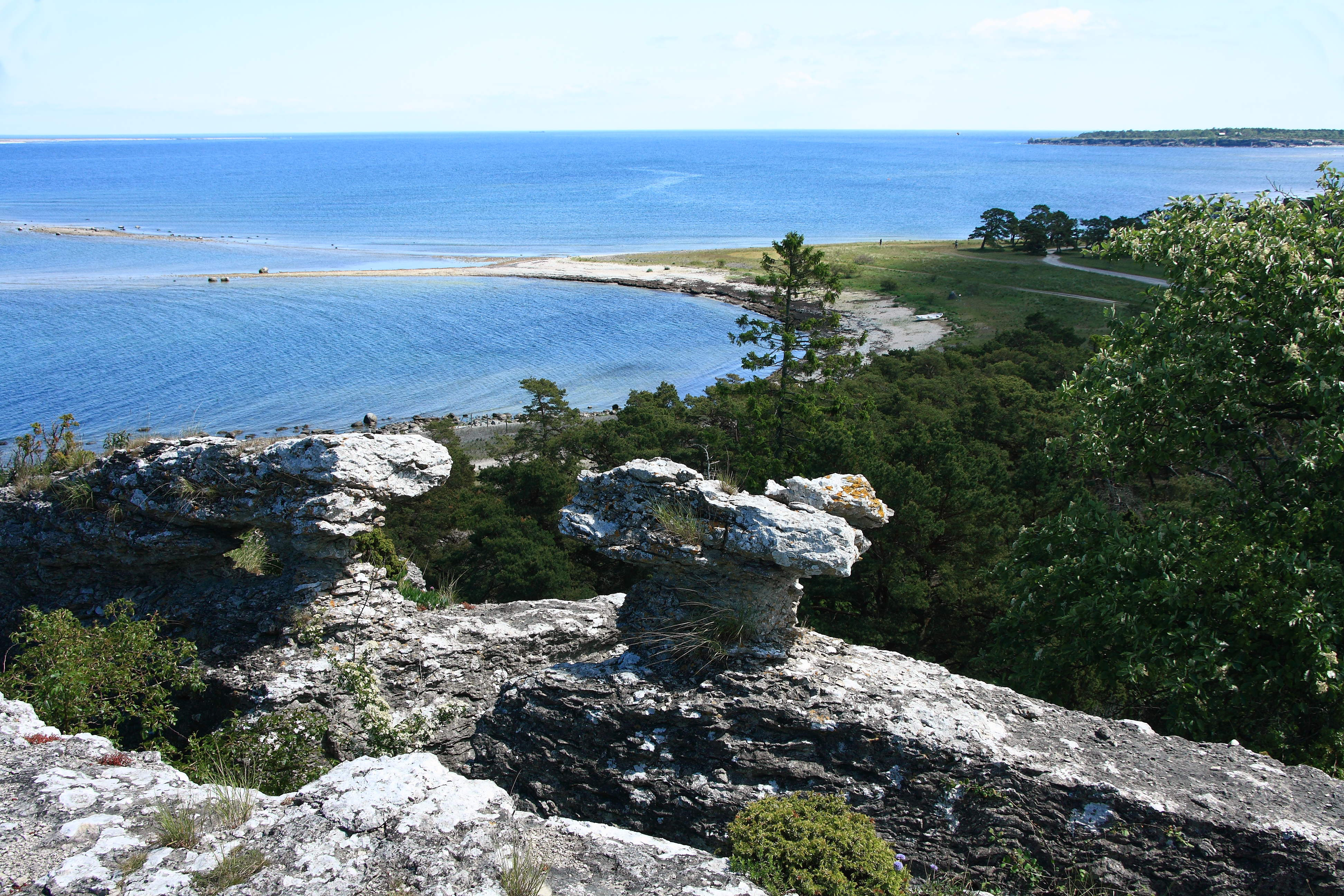
View from the hillfort

The castle, or fort, was built on Grogarnshuvud ("The Grogarn Head"), the northern tip of Grogarnsberget. The 30 m (98 ft) high sea cliffs provided protection on three sides. In the south there were two 100 m (330 ft) long stone walls with palisades. From the site of the former castle, other major hillforts in the region are visible. Archaeological investigations of the outer ramparts turned up arrowheads from the late Vendel Period (550–800 AD), which provided a clue as to the dating of the castle. A number of wooden posts were also found, probably formerly part of the palisades, that were dated to 740 AD. The fort had both an outer and an inner wall.

There are 82 such forts known on Gotland. Most of them has an interior surface of less than 800 m^{2} (8,600 ft^{2}). The one on Grogarnsberget, however, measures 450 m × 100 m (1,480 ft × 330 ft) (45,000 m^{2} (480,000 ft^{2})), making it one of the two largest hillforts on the island. House foundations from the Roman Iron Age – the Migration Period – were found inside the fortifications, unlike any other hillforts on the island.

The largest hillfort in Scandinavia is Halleberg in Västergötland, Sweden at about 20 km^{2} (7.7 mi^{2}), the second largest is Lollands Österborg on east Lolland, Denmark at about 5 km^{2} (1.9 mi^{2}) and the third largest is Torsburgen on Gotland, Sweden at about 1.2 km^{2} (0.46 mi^{2}).
