= Kräklingbo =

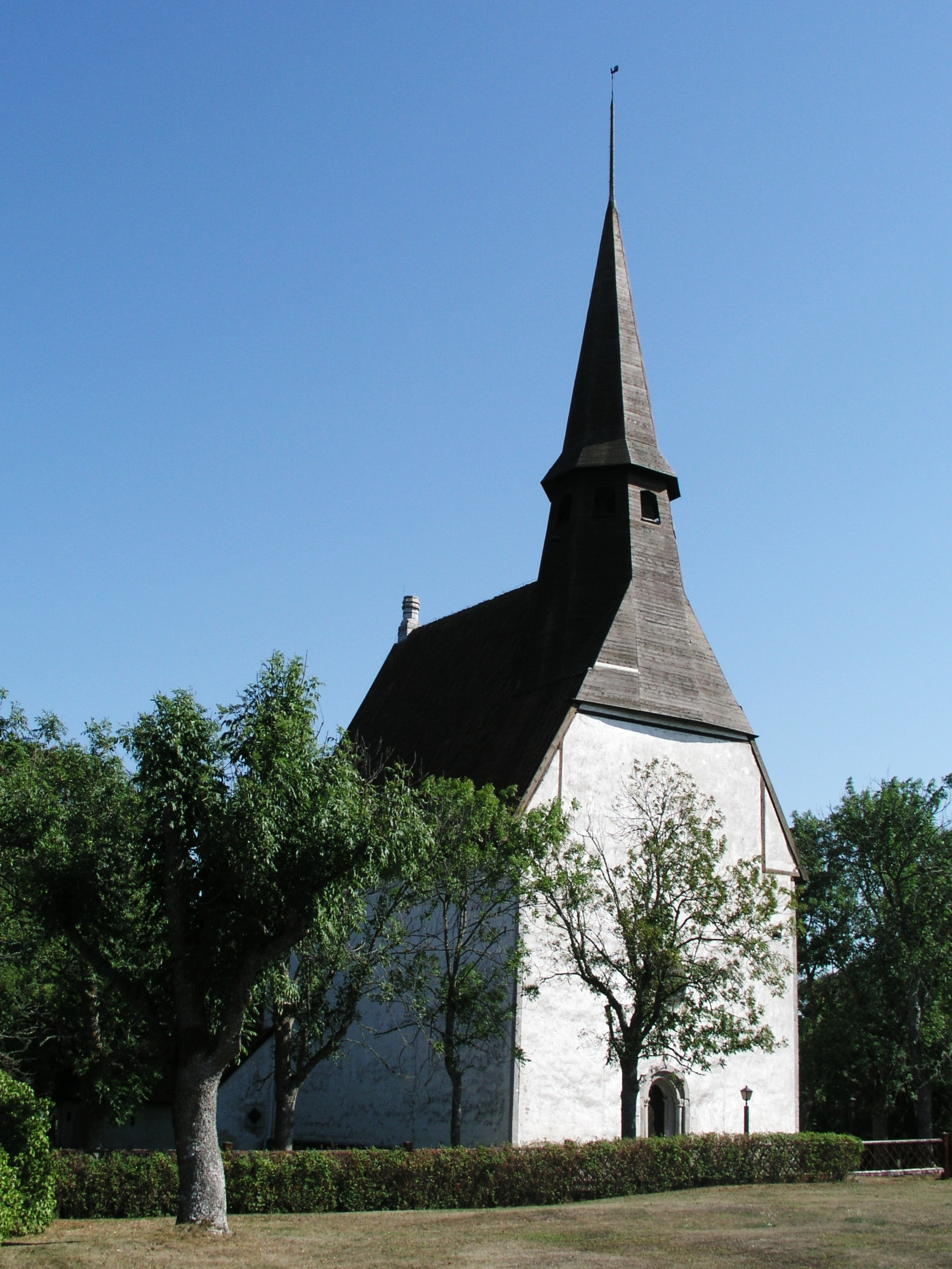
- Kräklingbo church

- Location within Gotland
- Coordinates: 57°26′42″N 18°42′41″E
- Country: Sweden
- Province: Gotland
- County: Gotland County
- Municipality: Gotland Municipality

Population (2014)
  - Total: 202
- Time zone: UTC+1 (CET)
  - Summer (DST): UTC+2 (CEST)

Kräklingbo (Swedish pronunciation: [ˈkrɛ̂ːklɪŋˌbuː]) is a populated area, a socken (not to be confused with parish), on the Swedish island of Gotland. It comprises the same area as the administrative Kräklingbo District, established on 1 January 2016.

The most visible feature at Kräklingbo is the Torsburgen, a fortified plateau. In 1992, it was the site of a large wildfire.

== Geography ==
Kräklingbo is the name of the socken as well as the district. It is also the name of the small village surrounding the medieval Kräklingbo Church, sometimes referred to as Kräklingbo kyrkby. It is situated near the central part of Gotland's east coast. As of 2019, Kräklingbo Church belongs to Östergarn parish in Romaklosters pastorat, along with the churches in Östergarn, Gammelgarn, Anga and Ala.

One of the asteroids in the Asteroid belt, 8682 Kräklingbo, is named after this place.

== Etymology ==
The name Kräklingbo dates from the 15th century, and was originally the name of a farm. The first part of the name (Kräkling) probably means "dry hook" as in dry twig or fork of a bough, the second part (bo) is old Swedish for "settlement".

== History ==
The most visible feature at Kräklingbo is the ancient fortress of Torsburgen, a fortified plateau towering above the rest of the landscape. Nearby, at Hajdeby farm, there are a number of visible Bronze Age grooves.

== Events ==
The annual Kräklingbo Market is one of the major autumn markets on Gotland. There are five official markets held on the island in August–October: Slite, Havdhem, Kräklingbo, Klintehamn and Hemse, each usually spanning a weekend.

== The great forest fire ==
The Gotland wildfire of 1992, sometimes called the Kräklingbo fire, started early in the morning on 9 July 1992 in the forest in the southern part of Torsburgen. It is one of the largest ancient fortresses in Sweden. Although no one died in the fire, it developed into one of the largest wildfires in Sweden. The fire destroyed vegetation over an area of more than 1,000 ha (2,500 acres), of which 740 ha (1,800 acres) was productive forest land. The fire resulted in one of the biggest rescue operations in modern times on Gotland.

=== Wildfire ===
The early summer of 1992 was unusually warm with little rain, leaving the ground extremely dry. On 9 July there was a moderate gale of about 7 on the Beaufort scale, coming from the south. The fire, probably started by a burning cigarette, started in the southern part of Torsburgen, a couple of hundred meters north of the Arde opening. The fire spread rapidly and soon developed into a canopy fire. Due to the wind a fire storm, about two kilometers wide, formed and advanced north toward Hajdeby farm and Kräklingbo church. The fire had three fronts. Two flanks, each approximately 6 km (3.7 mi) wide, slowly spreading outwards and a 2.5 km (1.6 mi) wide front advancing very rapidly in the north.

=== Suppression ===
The fire at Kräklingbo. Red approximately representing the area of the fire after three hours and grey the final area.

A day later, on the morning of 10 July, the fire was 1 km (0.62 mi) wide and about 5 km (3.1 mi) long. On site were approximately one hundred firefighters, sixty enlisted soldiers from the P 18 regiment in Visby and some volunteers. A command centre was established at Kräklingbo fire station. Helicopter Q 90 with crew from Visby also participated in suppressing the fire. Later on another helicopter, the Q 97 with a hastily formed crew, joined the operation as did helicopter Q 91. These three helicopters logged a total of 43 hours and 45 minutes in flight during the fire. They dropped 414 tanks, about 800 cubic metres (28,000 cu ft), of water.

During the day the fire advanced on the three farms at Hejdeby while the rescue command prepared to evacuate all residents in the area. There was a great deal of confusion about what to do until Nisse Olofsson, a former chief at the Kräklingbo fire station, more or less took over the fire suppression at Hejdeby with the help of about 20 volunteers. They succeeded in establishing a counter fire and stopped the main blaze just 10 m (33 ft) from Tors farm. At this time the flames were approximately 30 m (98 ft) high.

On the evening of 11 July, firebreaks had been established around the area, but the fire continued to rage inside.

On the morning of 13 July, the local radio station broadcast an announcement requesting all firefighters on vacation to report at the Visby fire station. Later it was announced that the worst stage of the fire had passed as a light rain fell on Gotland suppressing the fire. During the night the firefighters had also gone into the Torsburgen and conducted intense work to prevent the fire from spreading further within that area, but they were forced to retreat due to falling trees. About fifty firefighters now monitored the south part of Torsburgen and the fire was declared to be under control.

By this time, the police had trouble keeping away curious people gathering in the area. Even families with children had gone into the fire site despite warnings on local radio to respect the cordons and the risk of falling trees.

=== Aftermath ===
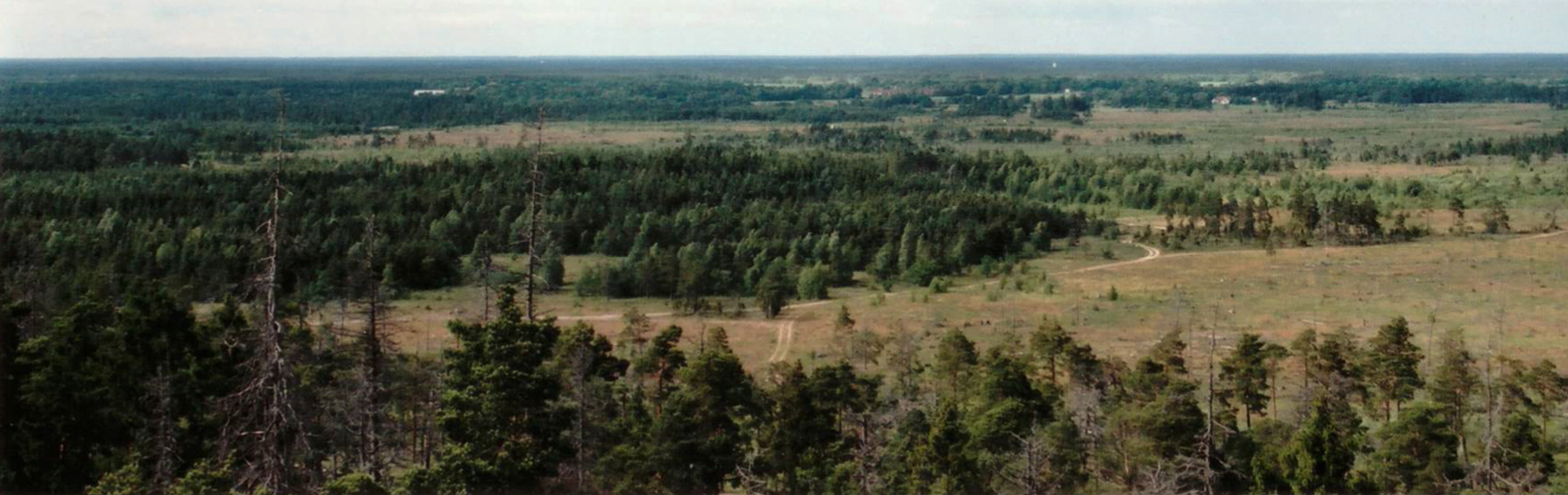
The area of the fire, a few years later, as seen from Torsburgen.

Suppression of the fire was the largest rescue operation on Gotland in modern times. The post–fire work continued for several years . The fire destroyed more than 1,000 ha (2,500 acres) of land. About 740 ha of these were productive forest land in the Kräklingbo and Gammelgarn area (total value of 20 million crowns, about US$3 million) and 41 land owners were affected. Nearly all of the forest in the central and north part of Torsburgen was more or less destroyed by the fire. It was more than a month later that the Rescue Department declared the operation finished. The total cost of the rescue operation was about 18.5 million crowns (about US$2.85 million) The Swedish Armed Forces contributed with 400 military personnel, communication equipment, helicopters and vehicles.

The fire in 1992, was by no means the first on the Torsburgen. In the summer of 1741, when Carl Linnaeus visited the fortress, he noted that it was almost without trees, "since wildfire had not so long ago destroyed it". The "wildfire" he spoke of was probably the large forest fire of 1655, which raged during that summer destroying parts of Alskog, Ala, Ardre and Kräklingbo parishes.

== Gallery ==
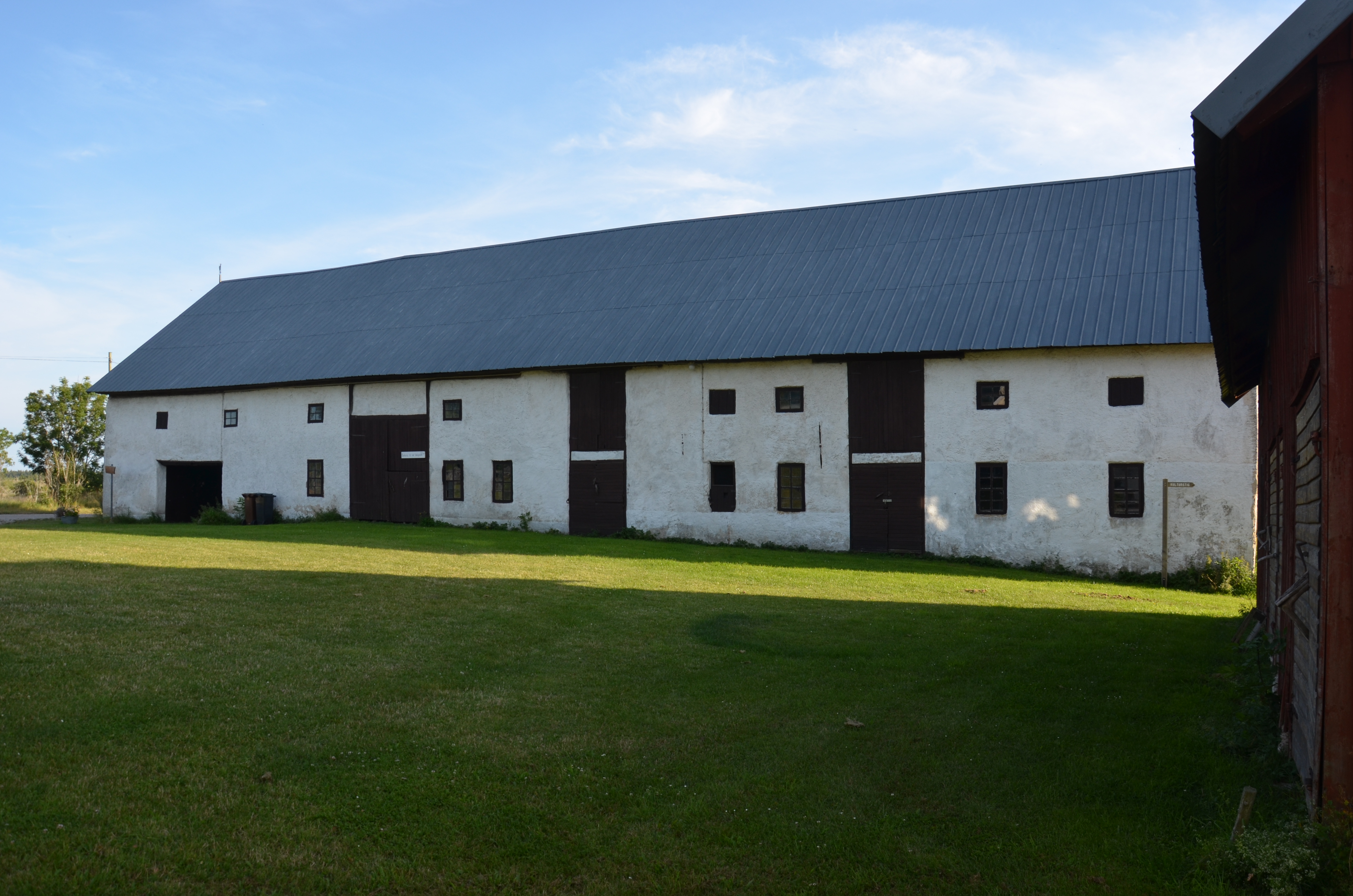
South Hajdeby, Kräklingbo.

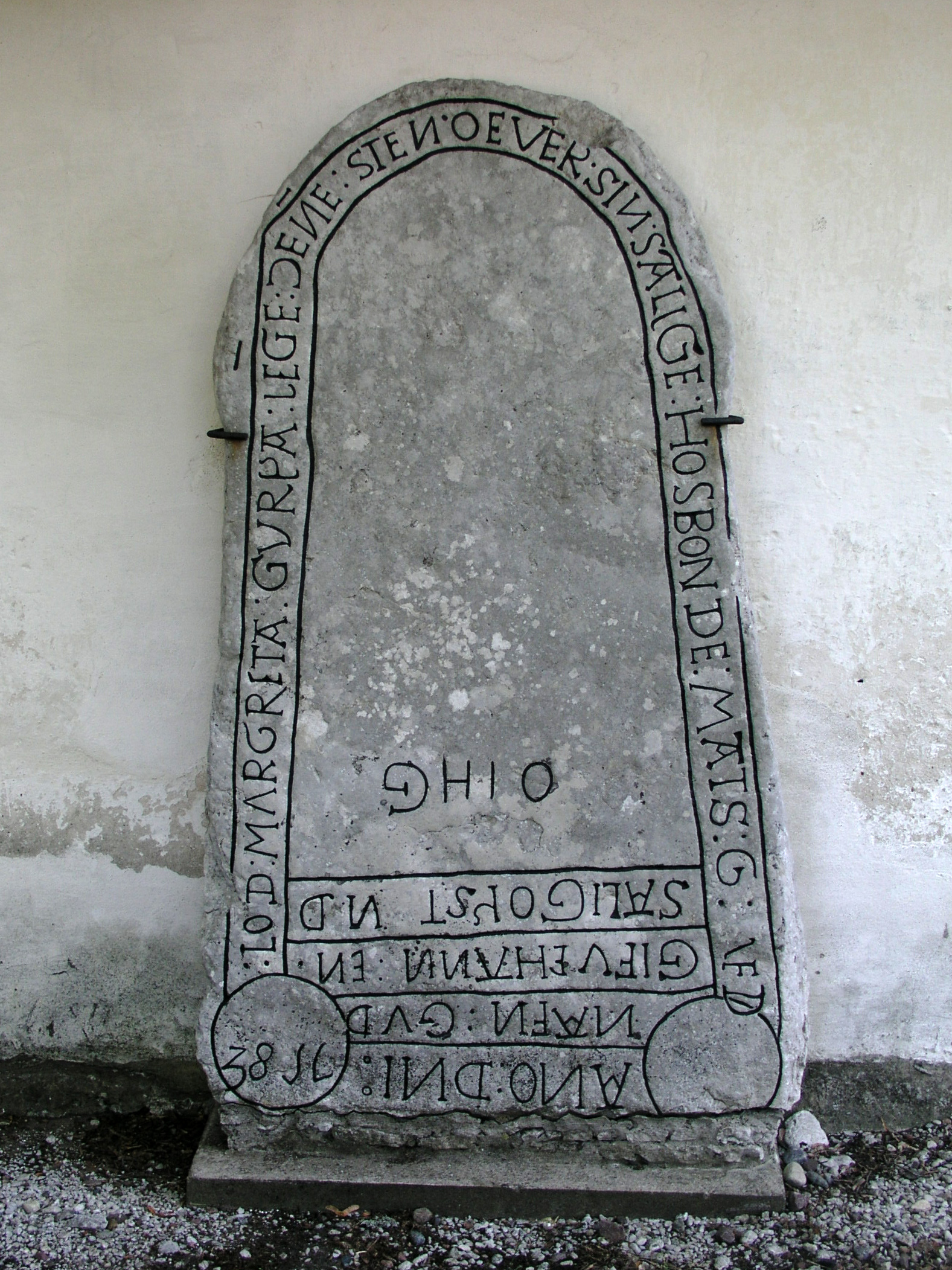
Tomb stone at Kräklingbo church.

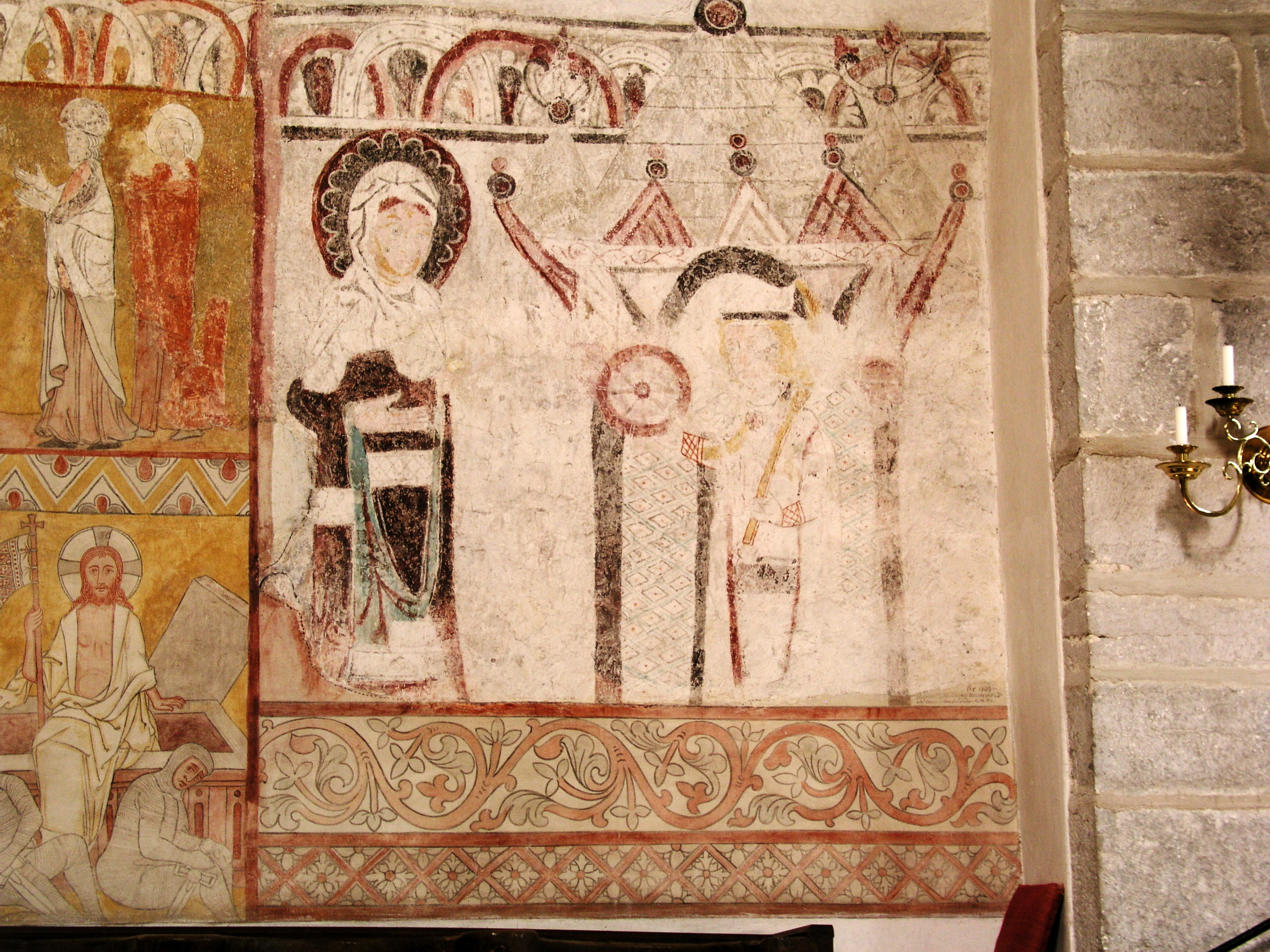
Paintings in Kräklingbo church.

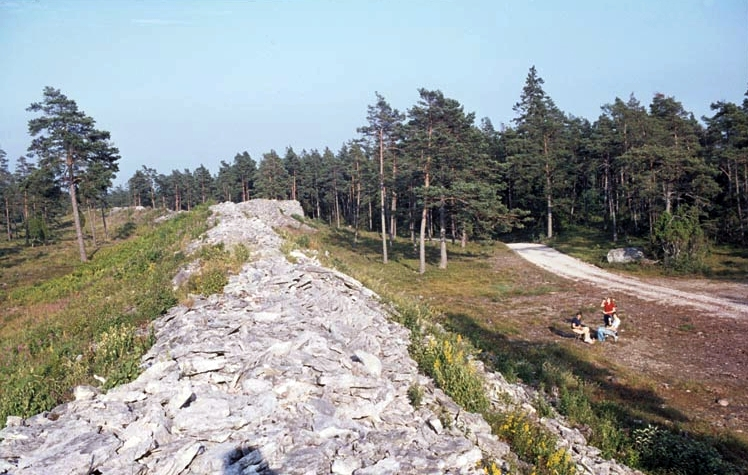
Ardre opening at Torsburgen, Kräklingbo.

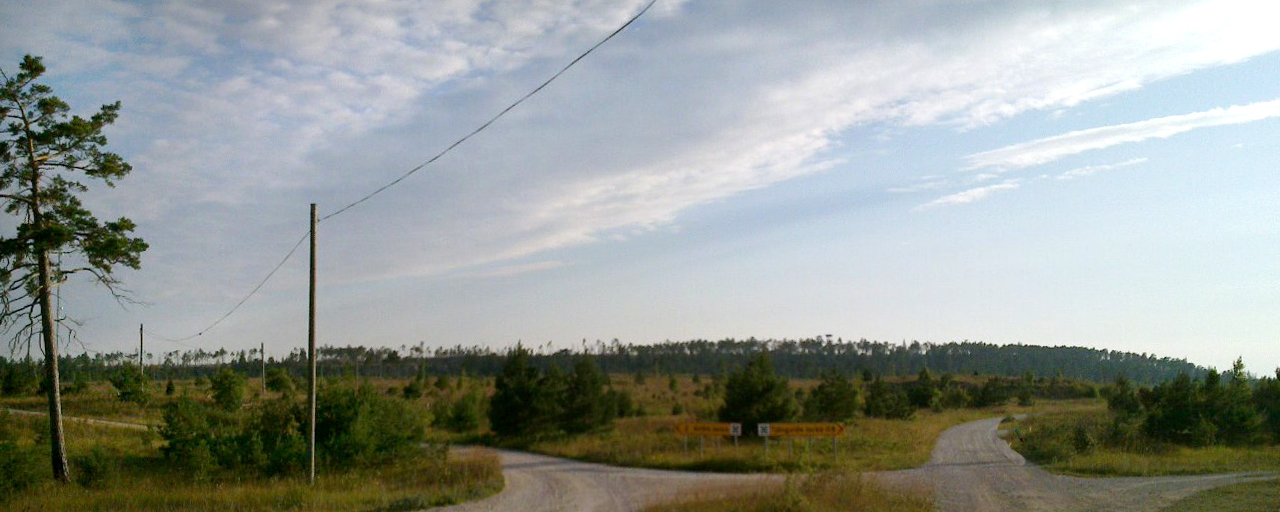
Torsburgen from a distance, Kräklingbo.

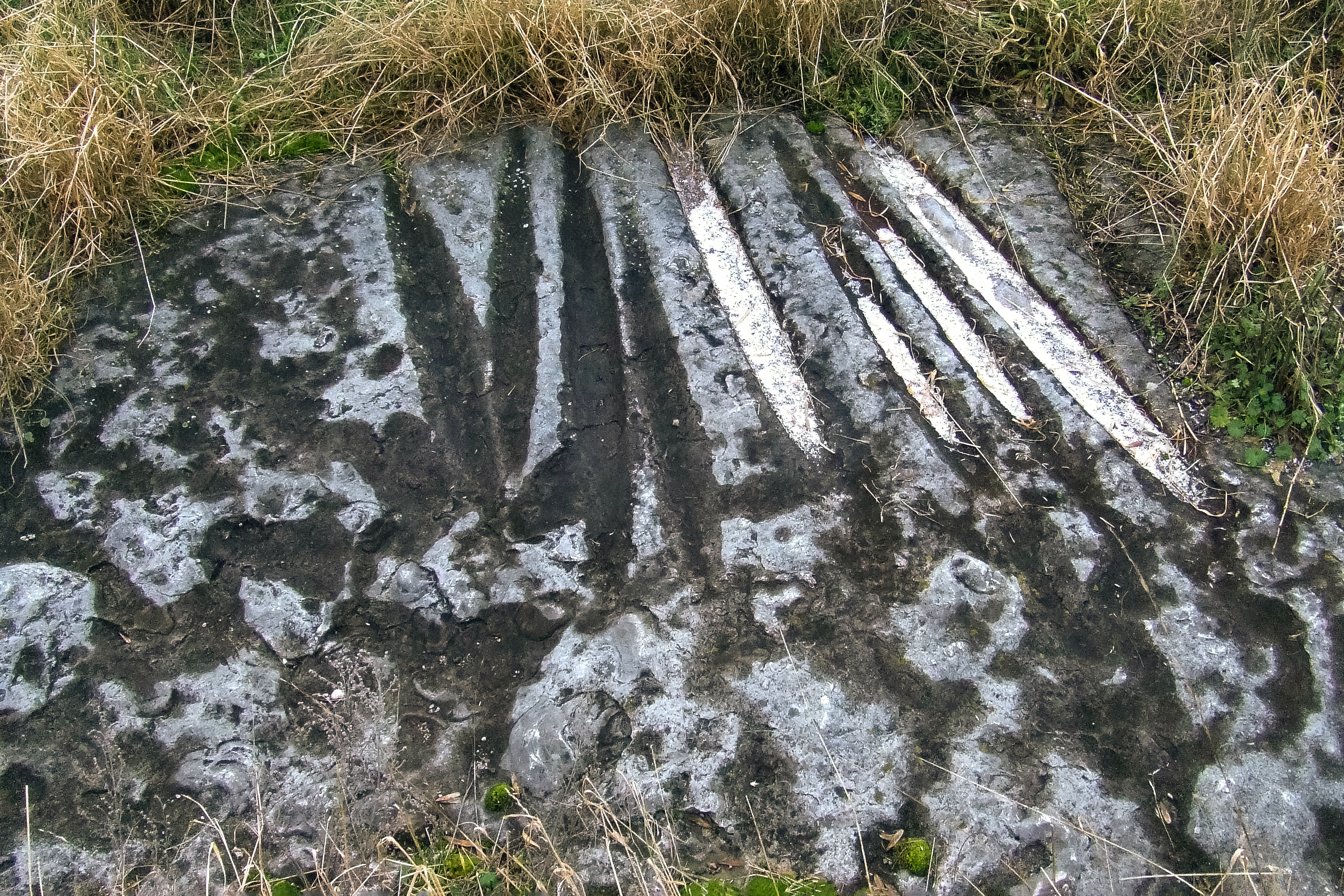
Grooves at Torsburgen, Kräklingbo.

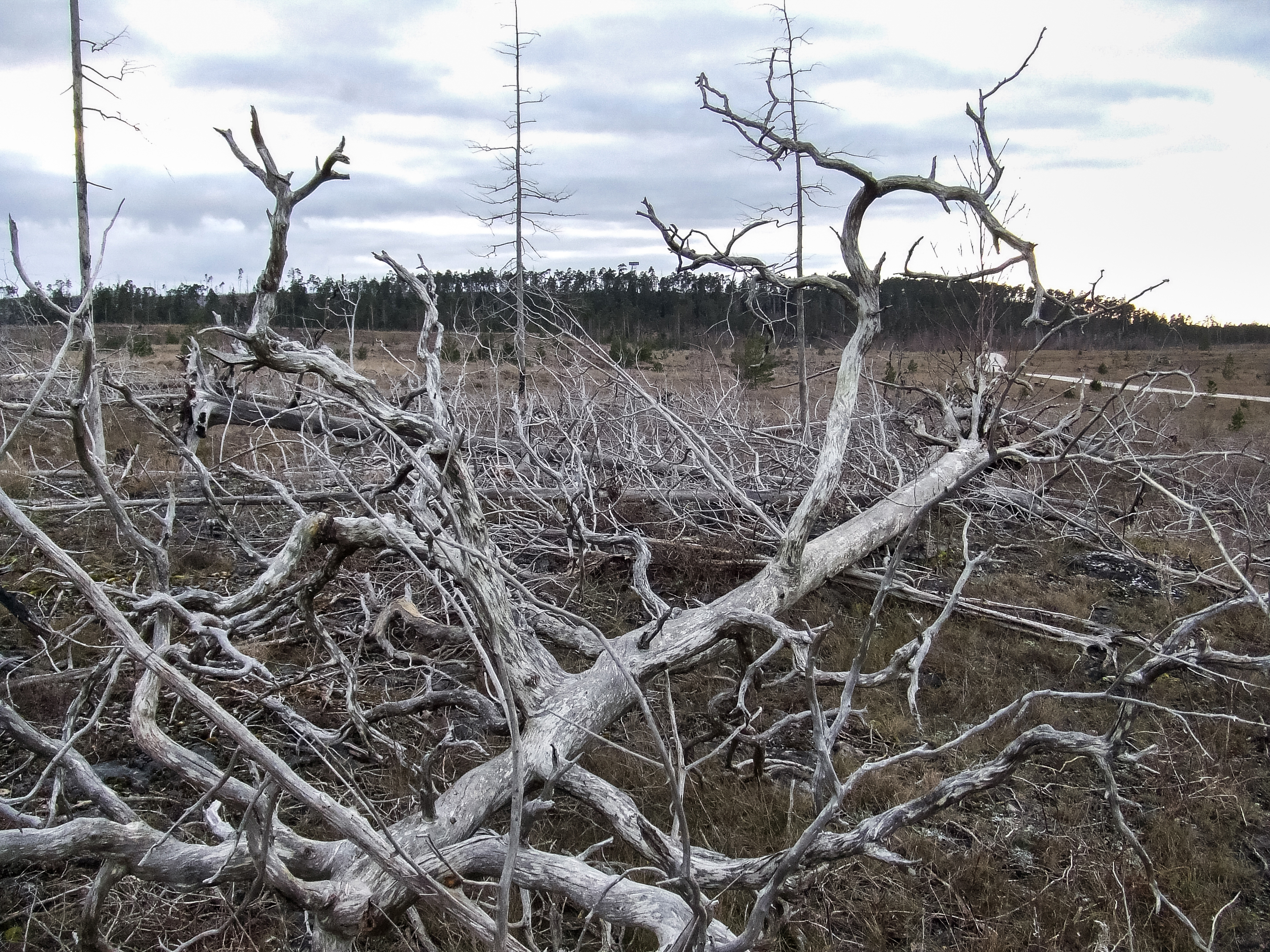
Torsburgen after the fire
