= Anga Church =

- Anga kyrka
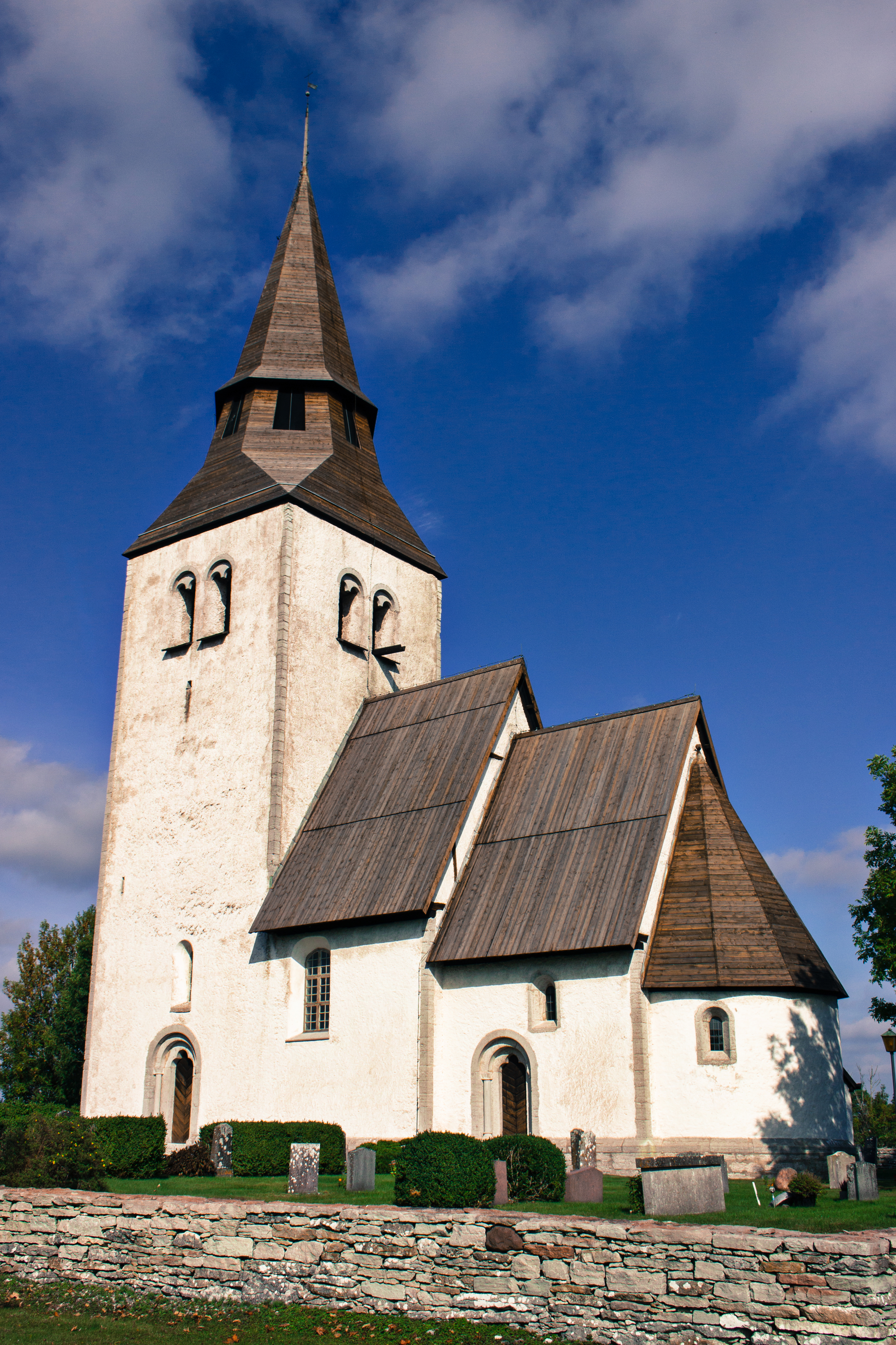
- Anga Church, view of the exterior

- Location on Gotland
- 57°28′49″N 18°42′23″E
- Country: Sweden
- Denomination: Church of Sweden
- Previous denomination: Catholic

Administration
- Diocese: Visby

Anga Church (Swedish: Anga kyrka) is a 13th century church in Anga on the Swedish island of Gotland. It is one of the most well-preserved Romanesque churches on Gotland, and was possibly preceded by a stave church. Inside, the church is decorated with medieval murals from three different periods, as well as some medieval furnishings. Some wooden sculptures from the church are today exhibited in a museum in Visby. The church belongs to the Church of Sweden and lies within the Diocese of Visby.

== History and architecture ==
Anga Church takes its name from a now vanished farmstead, mentioned in a runestone inscription at the end of the 11th century. The first church was probably built as a church for the large farm. During archaeological excavations carried out in 1946–1947, traces of burnt wood were found, indicating that the first church may have been a stave church.

The presently visible Romanesque church was built during the 13th century. Thanks to dendrochronological investigations of still intact wooden details, the church can be dated quite precisely. The choir and apse were built circa 1215, and are the oldest parts of the church. The nave dates from 1250 and the tower from 1265.

The church is one of the most well-preserved Romanesque churches on Gotland, and gives a good impression of how most of the churches on the island might once have looked. The interior still has a rich decoration in the form of murals. The wall paintings date from two periods, the oldest ones from the end of the 13th century. These are mostly ornamental, and unusual in that they are signed by the artist, a painter named Halvard. From the same time dates a runic inscription in Old Gutnish, which tells the name of the farmers of the parish who contributed oxen and day's works to the construction of the church, showing that the building of the church was a communal undertaking. A later set of murals depict the Passion of Christ together with legends of saints, and were made during the middle of the 15th century.

The church used to house medieval wooden sculptures, the majority of which are today at the Museum of Gotland in Visby. Still in the church is the altarpiece, dating from the 1370s, and the triumphal cross from the 15th century. There is also a gravestone in the choir from the 13th century, with a runic inscription.

The church belongs to the Church of Sweden and lies within the Diocese of Visby.
