= Hörsne Church =

- Hörsne kyrka
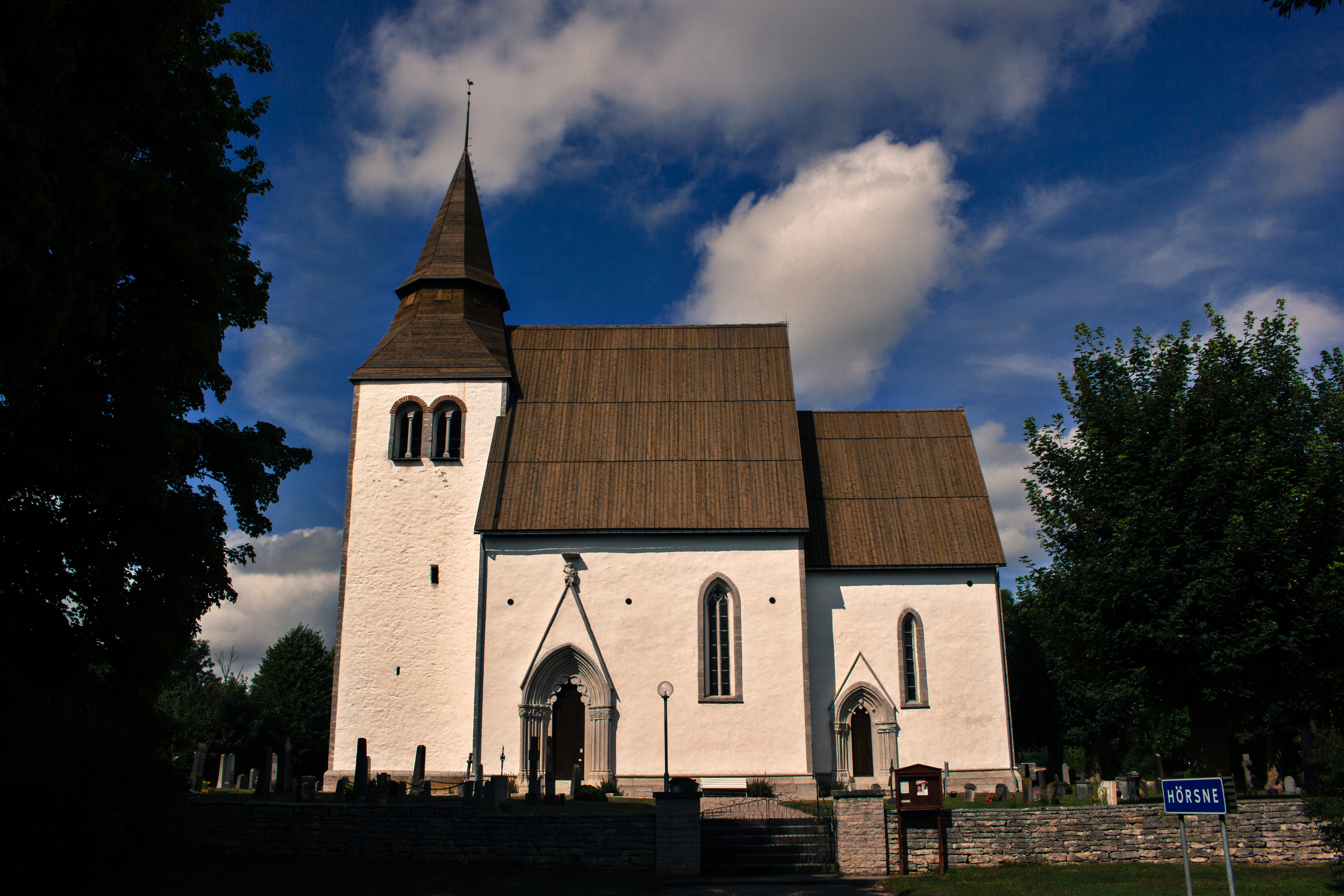
- Hörsne Church, view of the exterior

- Location on Gotland
- 57°33′30″N 18°35′51″E
- Country: Sweden
- Denomination: Church of Sweden

Administration
- Diocese: Visby

Hörsne Church (Swedish: Hörsne kyrka) is a medieval church in Hörsne-Bara on the Swedish island of Gotland. Dating from the 13th to the 14th century, the church has unusually richly decorated portals. It belongs to the Diocese of Visby of the Church of Sweden.

== History ==
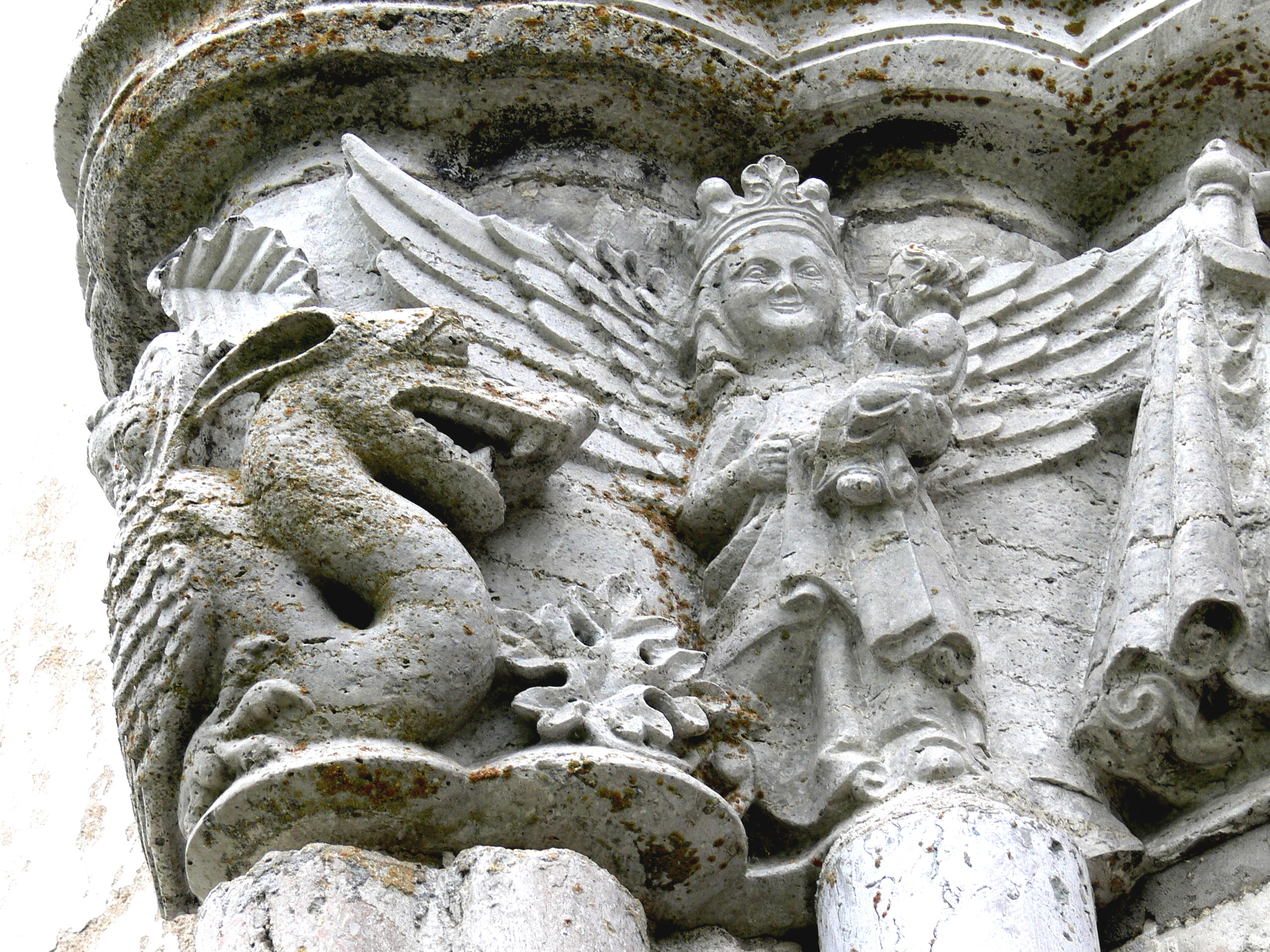
Carved stone decorations in the main portal

A first stone church was built in Romanesque style here during the 12th century. The oldest part of presently visible church however, is the tower dating from the first half of the 13th century. The rest of the Romanesque church was eventually pulled down and replaced with a Gothic main building. Thus the choir and the vestry are from the end of the 13th century, while the nave was built during the early 14th century. When the nave was constructed, the choir was also modestly "modernised" by the insertion of the presently visible eastern window. Original plans probably intended to eventually also replace the comparatively small tower with a more proportional, Gothic church tower.

The church retains much of its medieval character. A restoration was carried out in 1937.

== Architecture ==
The church has two unusually richly sculptured portals. The choir portal display carved foliage and a few figures: two fish and a lion. The main portal is crowned by a sculpture of Saint Michael wielding a club and carrying a shield, sitting astride the wimperg. Underneath, the capitals are profusely sculpted with scenes from the apocalypse. Other capitals are decorated with foliage ornamentation. Both of the portals may have been made by the stone sculptor or workshop known by its modern notname Egypticus, which was active on Gotland.

Some of the church windows display original stained glass paintings, displaying architectural motifs, foliage and a depiction of Bartholomew the Apostle. The church's altarpiece is a curious mix between Gothic wooden sculptures, evidently stemming from an earlier (14th century) altarpiece, incorporated into a Baroque altar from 1701. The church also has a notable triumphal cross, where the figure of Jesus is 15th century but the cross itself from the 17th. The pews, the pulpit and baptismal font are all from the 17th and 18th centuries.
