= Ala, Gotland =

Ala
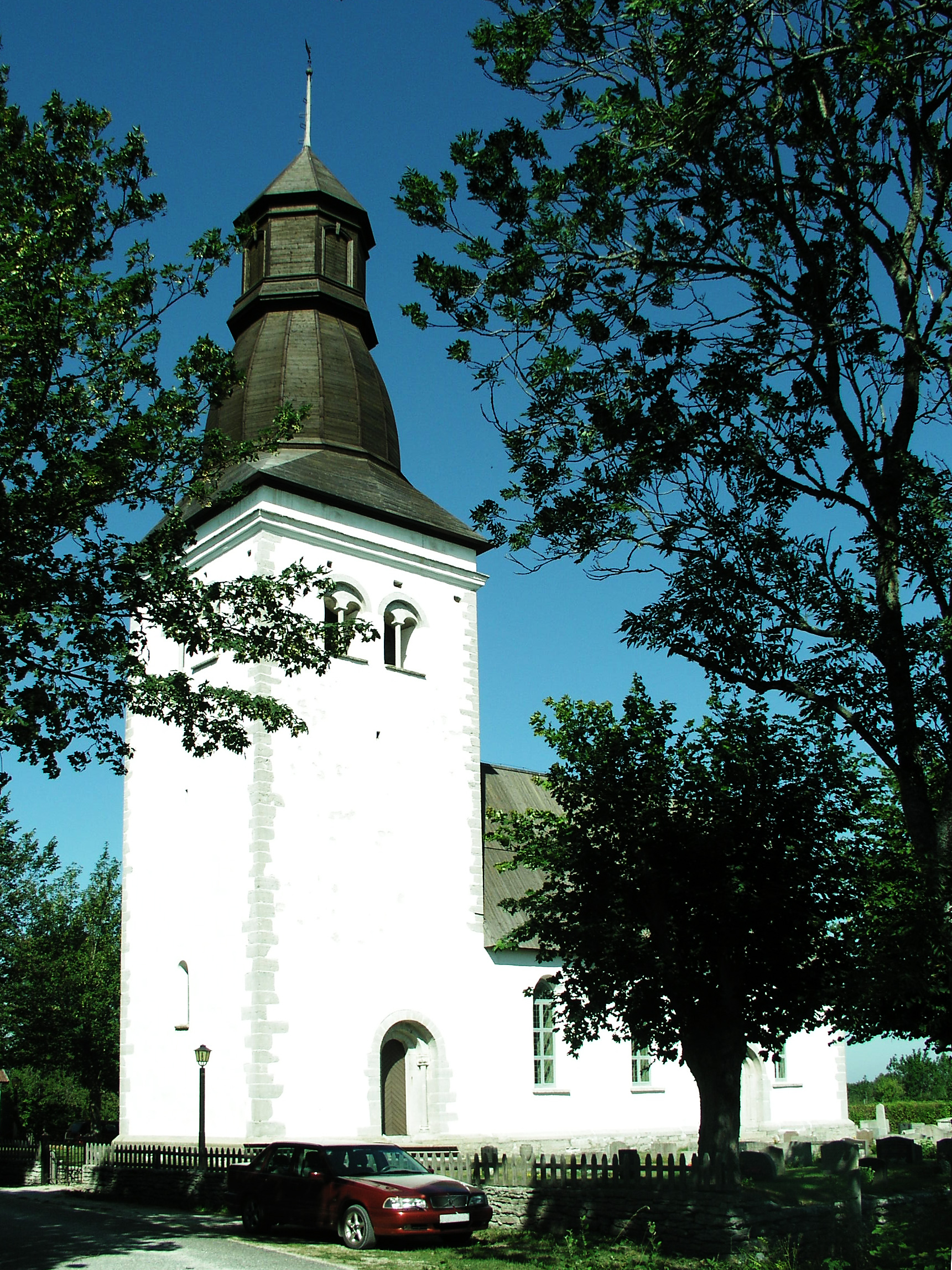
- Ala Church

- Location within Gotland
- Coordinates: 57°25′8″N 18°38′7″E
- Country: Sweden
- Province: Gotland
- County: Gotland County
- Municipality: Gotland Municipality

Area
  - Total: 31.74 km^{2} (12.25 sq mi)

Population (2014)
  - Total: 125
- Time zone: UTC+1 (CET)
  - Summer (DST): UTC+2 (CEST)

Ala is a populated area, a socken (not to be confused with parish), on the Swedish island of Gotland. It comprises the same area as the administrative Ala District, established on 1 January 2016.

Ala is known for the old carvings, some medieval, of ships on the walls of the church tower. The carvings are reminiscent of the one in Fide.

== Geography ==
Ala is situated in the central east part of Gotland. The medieval Ala Church is located in the socken. As of 2023, Ala Church belongs to Östergarn parish in Romaklosters pastorat, along with the churches in Östergarn, Gammelgarn, Kräklingbo and Anga.
