= Gammelgarn Church =

- Gammelgarn kyrka
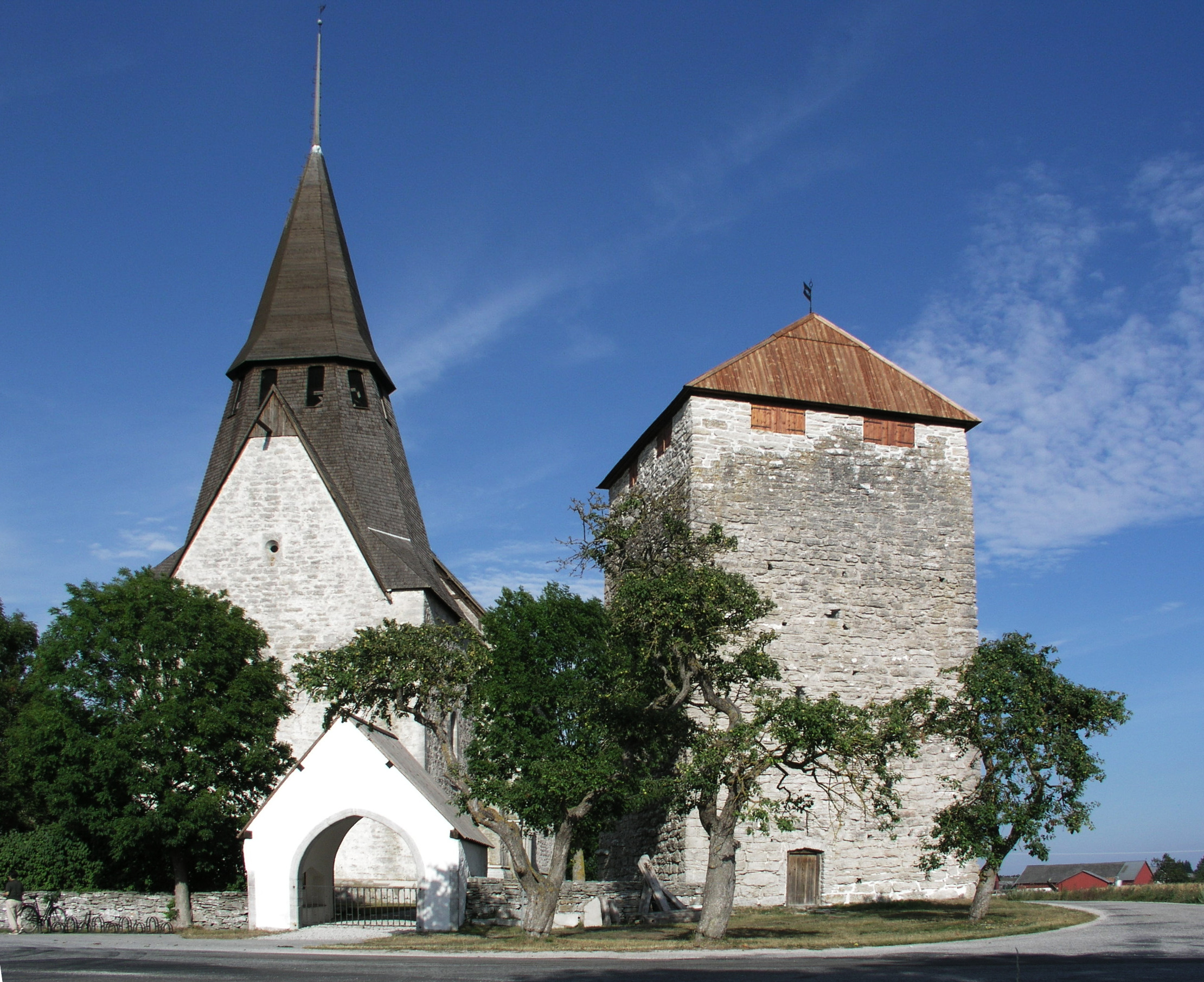
- Gammelgarn Church, view of the church and the medieval defensive tower

- Location on Gotland
- 57°24′17″N 18°48′16″E
- Country: Sweden
- Denomination: Church of Sweden

Administration
- Diocese: Visby

Gammelgarn Church (Swedish: Gammelgarns kyrka) is a medieval church in Gammelgarn on the Swedish island of Gotland. The largely Gothic church stands next to an older defensive tower. The church's main portal is richly decorated with medieval sculpture, and the interior contains an altarpiece from the 14th century of high craftsmanship. The church is in the Diocese of Visby of the Church of Sweden.

== History ==
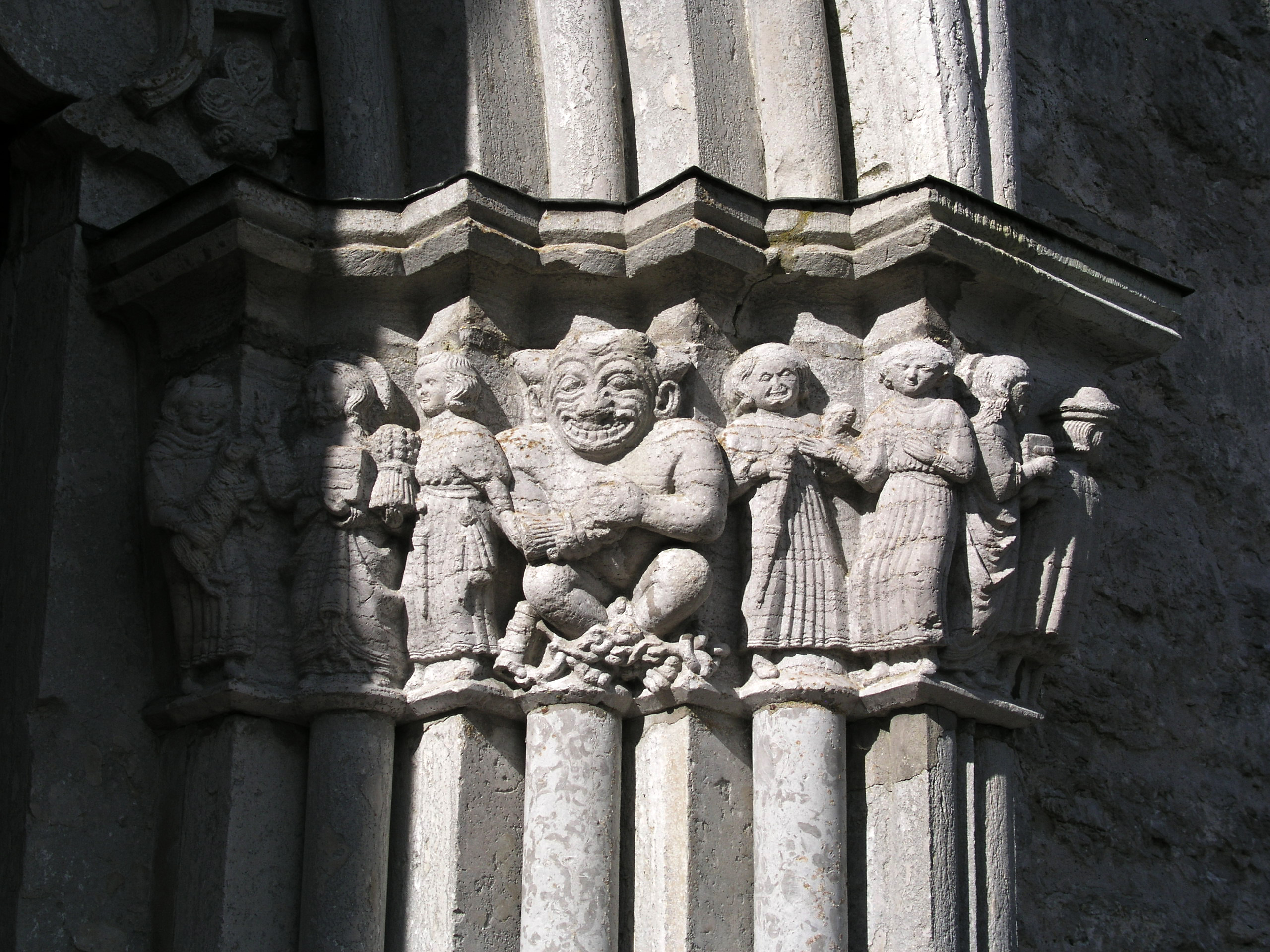
Detail of the decorated main portal

The church is built next to a defensive tower, erected in the 12th century and probably built to protect the congregation from raiders from across the Baltic Sea. The present-day church is largely from the 14th century. Only the tower remains of an older church on the same site. The tower was originally part of the nave of this first, Romanesque church. The current tower roof dates from 1755.

== Architecture ==
The church is a High Gothic building, characterised by a spacious nave, divided into four vaults by a single central column. The choir lacks an apse and instead the eastern end of the church is adorned with three Gothic windows.

Possibly the most noteworthy part of the church is the southern portal, which is richly sculpted. Dating from the 14th century, it was made by the Gotlandic workshop or sculptor commonly referred to by the notname Egypticus. The portal displays scenes from the Old Testament.

The interior of the church contains fragments of medieval murals. The altarpiece is a piece dating from the 14th century of fine craftsmanship, and the church also has a medieval baptismal font. There is also a medieval gravestone slab in the floor of the choir, which is inscribed with runes. Other furnishings date from the late 17th century (the pulpit) and the 18th century (choir stalls and pews).
