= Garde Church =

- Garde kyrka
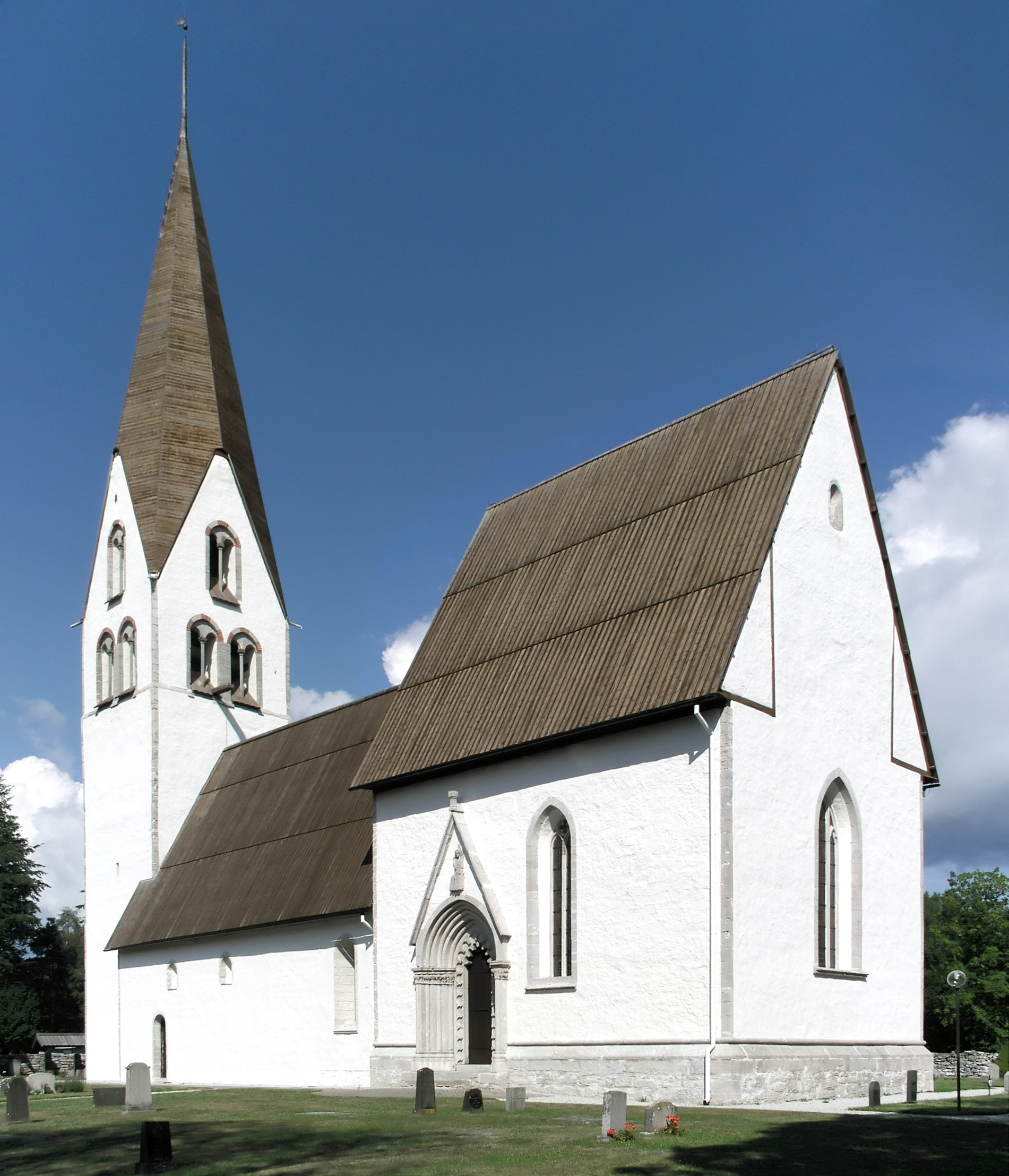
- Garde Church, view from the south east

- Location on Gotland Garde Church (Europe)
- 57°19′02″N 18°34′56″E
- Country: Sweden
- Denomination: Church of Sweden

Garde Church (Swedish: Garde kyrka, sometimes also Garda Church) is a medieval church in Garde on the Swedish island of Gotland. It was built in stages during the Middle Ages. The oldest part is the nave and the base of the tower, while the most recently constructed part is the large chancel. A large renovation was carried out in the 1960s. Garde Church together with its cemetery and its four lychgates constitute one of the most well-preserved medieval church ensembles in Sweden.

The church is built of limestone and whitewashed. Three of its portals are of a simple, Romanesque design, typical for the oldest churches on Gotland. The fourth portal, leading to the chancel, is Gothic in style. The church contains wall paintings from c. 1200 in Russo-Byzantine style, unique in Sweden. Some of its furnishings, such as the baptismal font and the triumphal cross also date from the same time, while the altarpiece is from the 17th century. It belongs to the Church of Sweden and lies in the Diocese of Visby.

== Location and surroundings ==
Garde Church and its cemetery forms one of the most well-preserved medieval church ensembles in Sweden. It is located around 300 metres (980 ft) north of the main road between Ljugarn and Lye on eastern Gotland. The area is considered a cultural heritage environment of national interest. The church lies in the centre of the cemetery, which is surrounded by a low wall. The wall has been repaired several times throughout the centuries but never substantially changed since it was built. It is between c. 160 centimetres (63 in) and 110 centimetres (43 in) high and has four original lychgates.

The western lychgate is the main entrance and one of the largest medieval lychgates in Sweden, probably constructed in the first half of the 13th century. It is built in three storeys of tufted limestone and whitewashed, except for the corners and the portal. The lychgate originally had two gates, and the covered space between them is equipped with two niches with seats. The two storeys above were used as a granary, originally for storing the church tithe, until 1917. The top floor of the lychgate was also used as a magazine for the church.

The southern and northern lychgates are practically identical, as is the eastern, though it is smaller than the other gates. They are all made of whitewashed tufted limestone with the exception of corners and skirtings which are made of carefully hewn limestone. Inside they have niches with seats. They date from the 14th century. There is also a lychgate that leads to the vicarage, located just northeast of the church, from the road. It is also from the 14th century, and the only one of its kind left on Gotland. A mason's mark in five places on the northern lychgate is identical to mason's marks found in Martebo Church and Stånga Church.

Several graves from the Viking Age, belonging to Christians, have been found in the cemetery, containing fragments of clothing. Before 1739, the layout of the cemetery was such that the richest people were buried closest to the church to the south and east, and poorer people to the west of the church. North of the church was the burial place for criminals.

Lychgates of the church

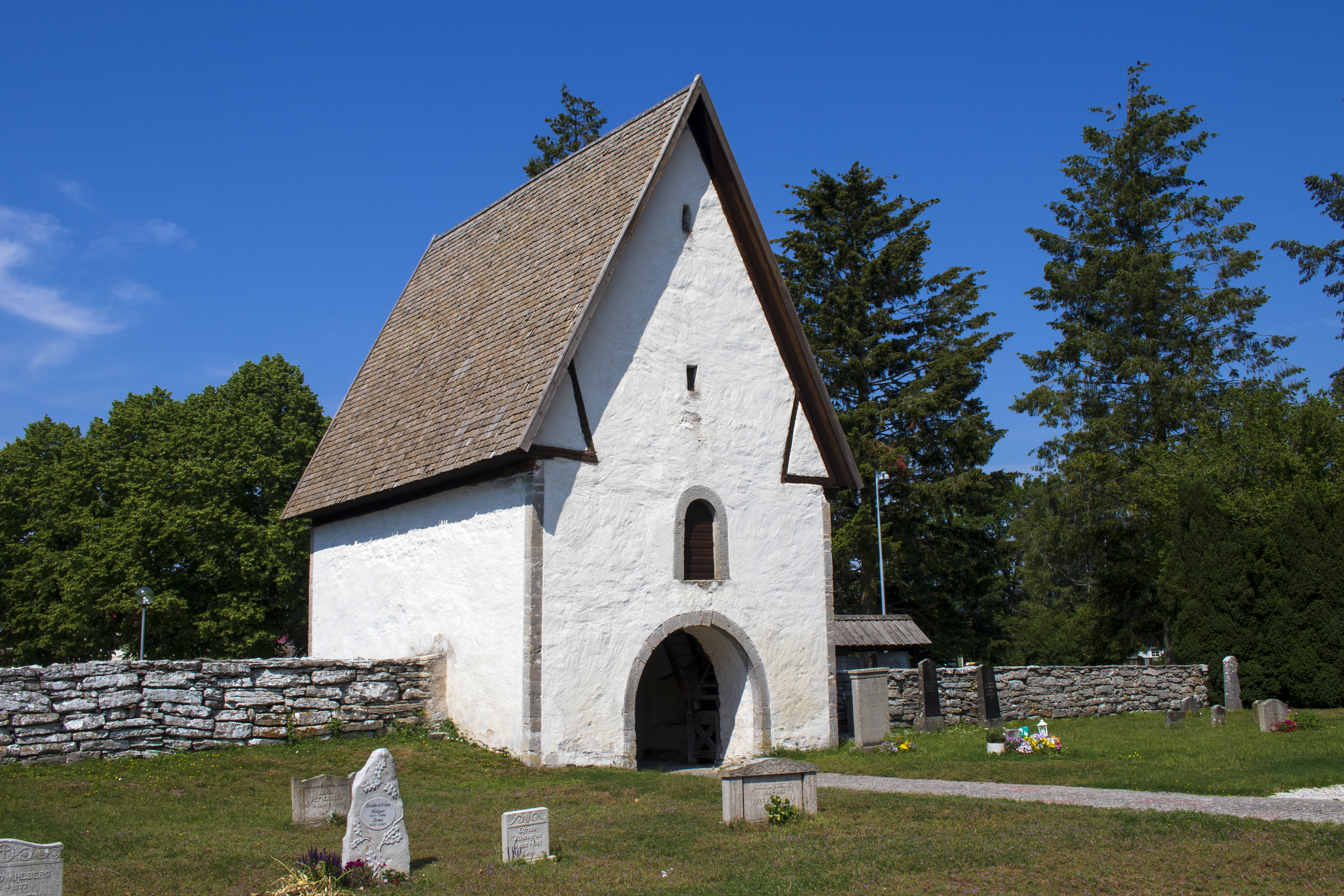
Western (main) lychgate

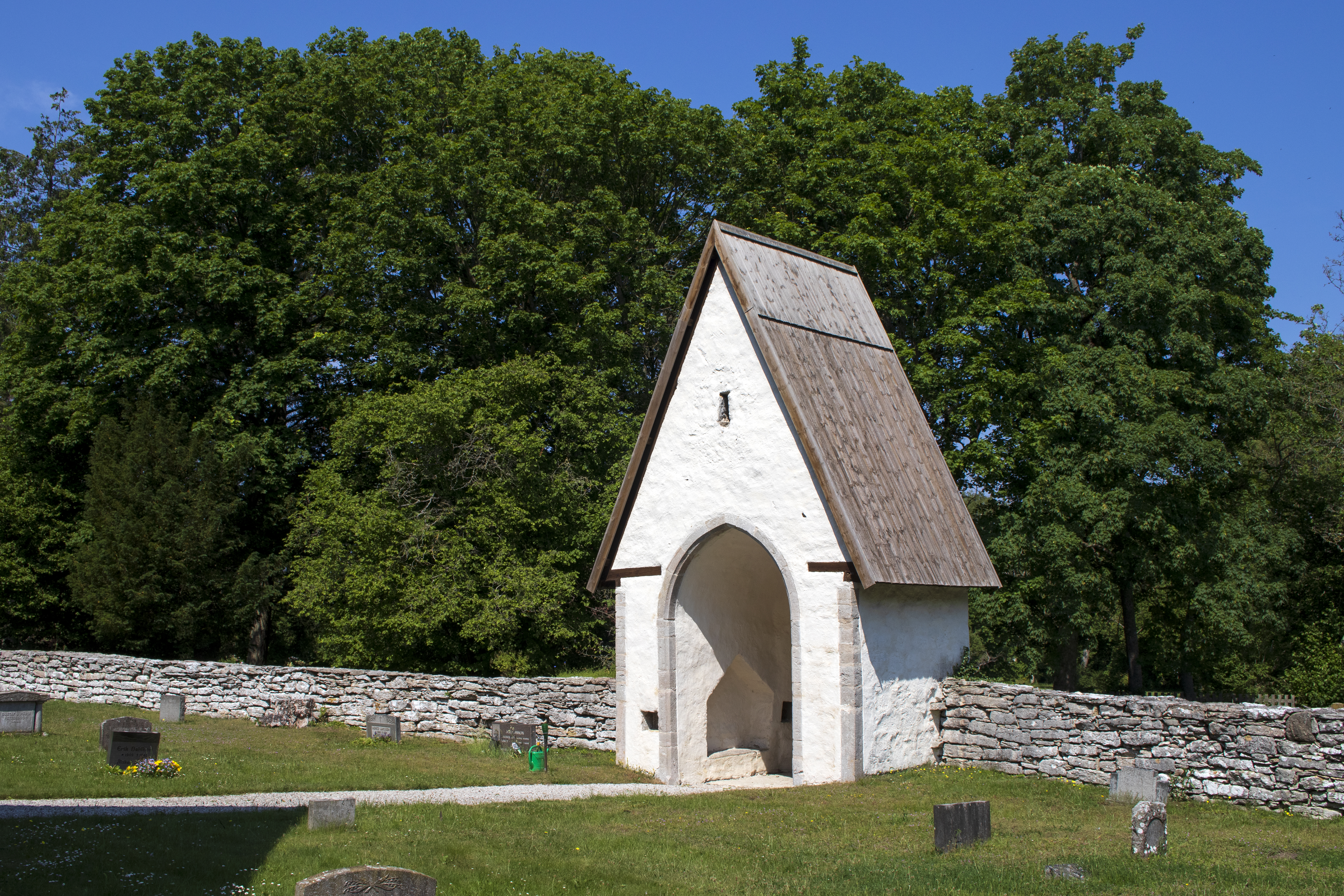
Northern lychgate

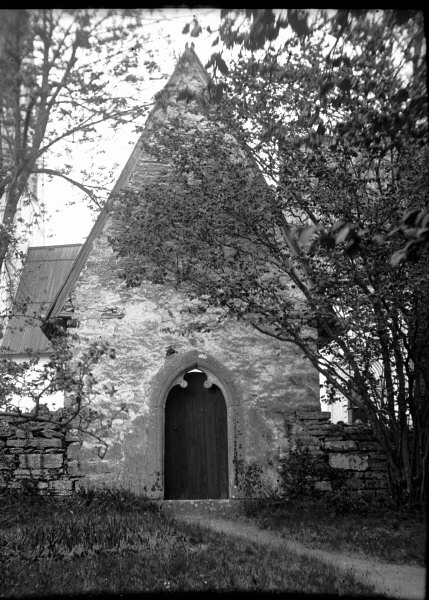
Southern lychgate

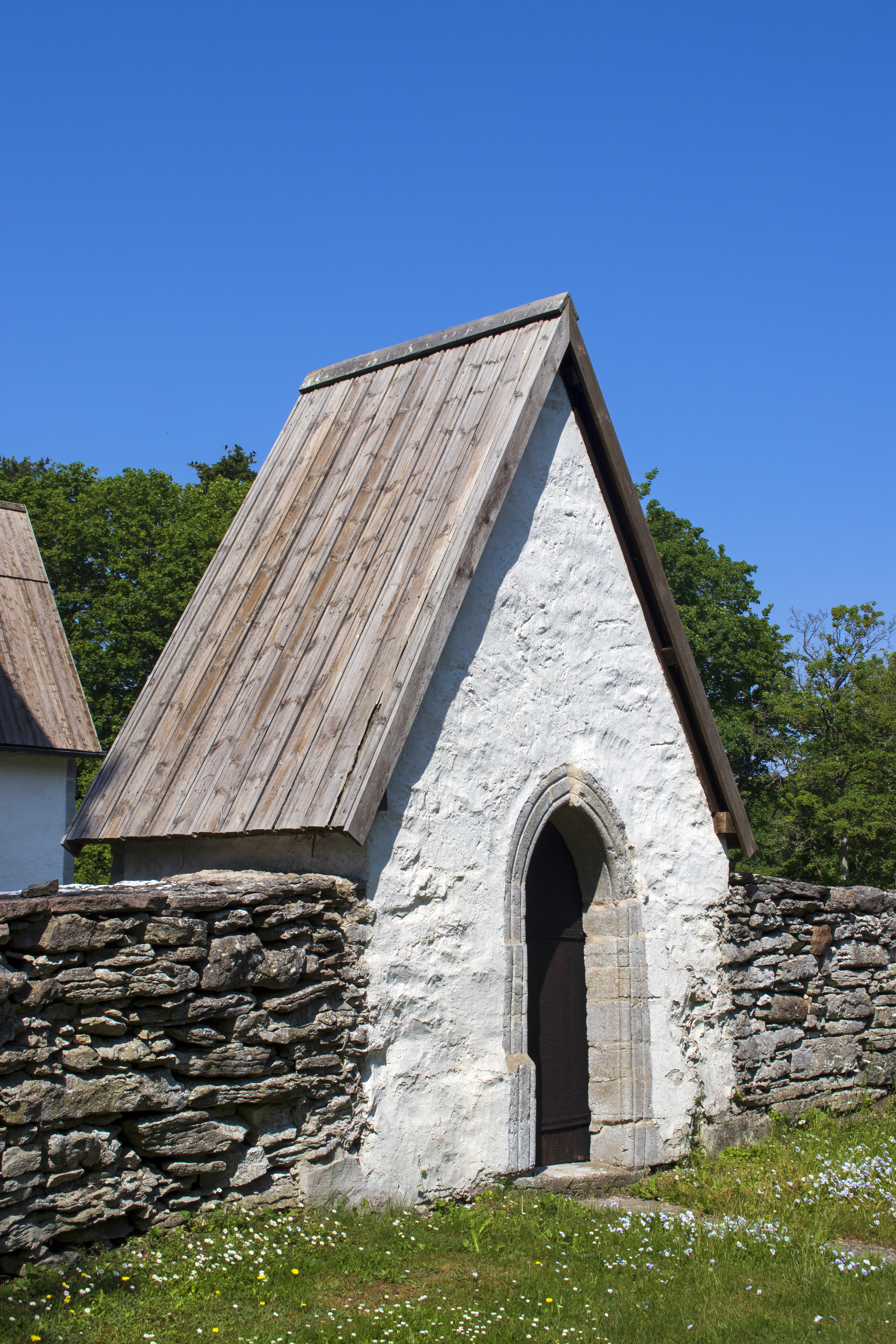
Eastern lychgate

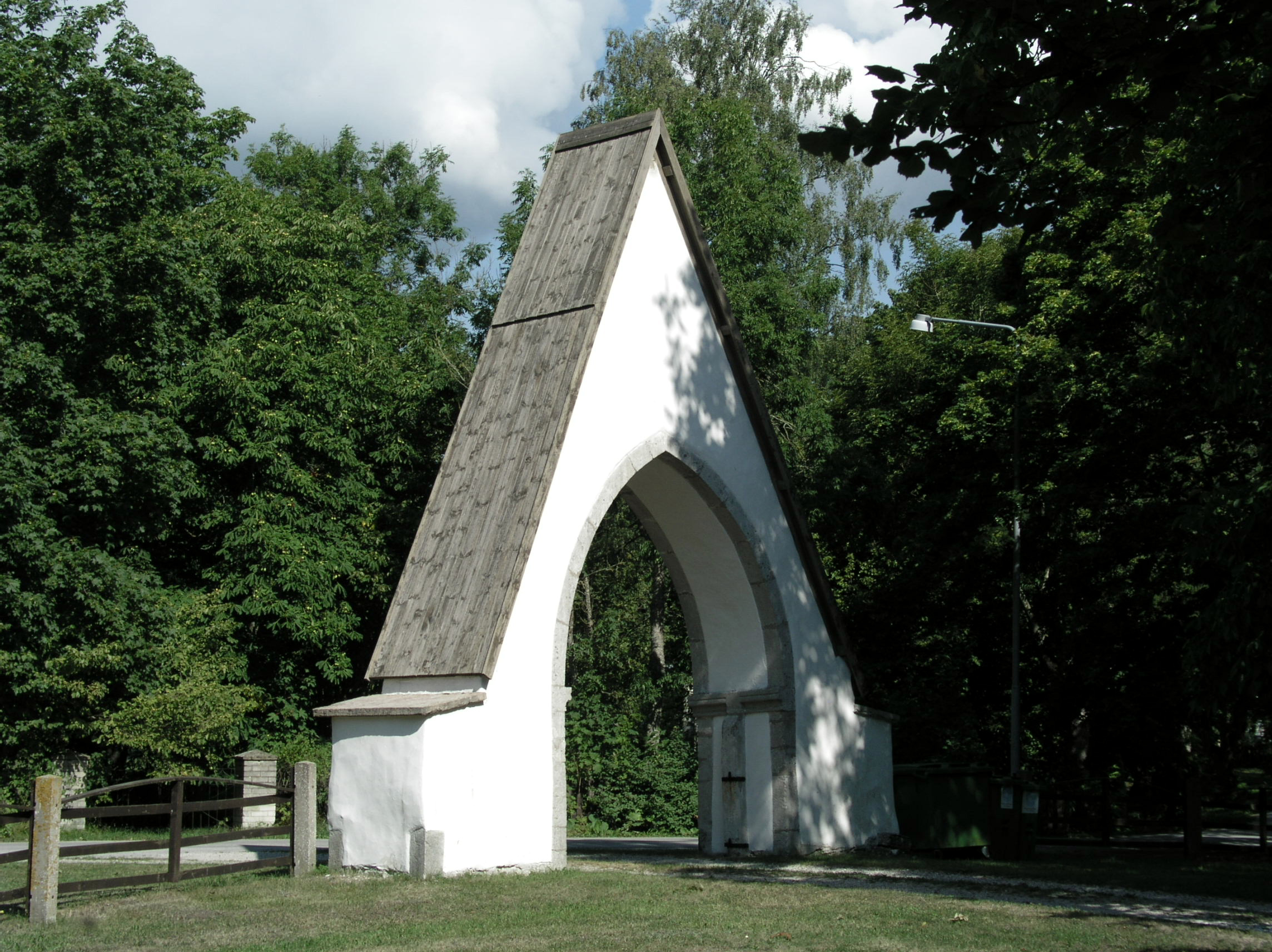
Lychgate leading to the vicarage

== History ==
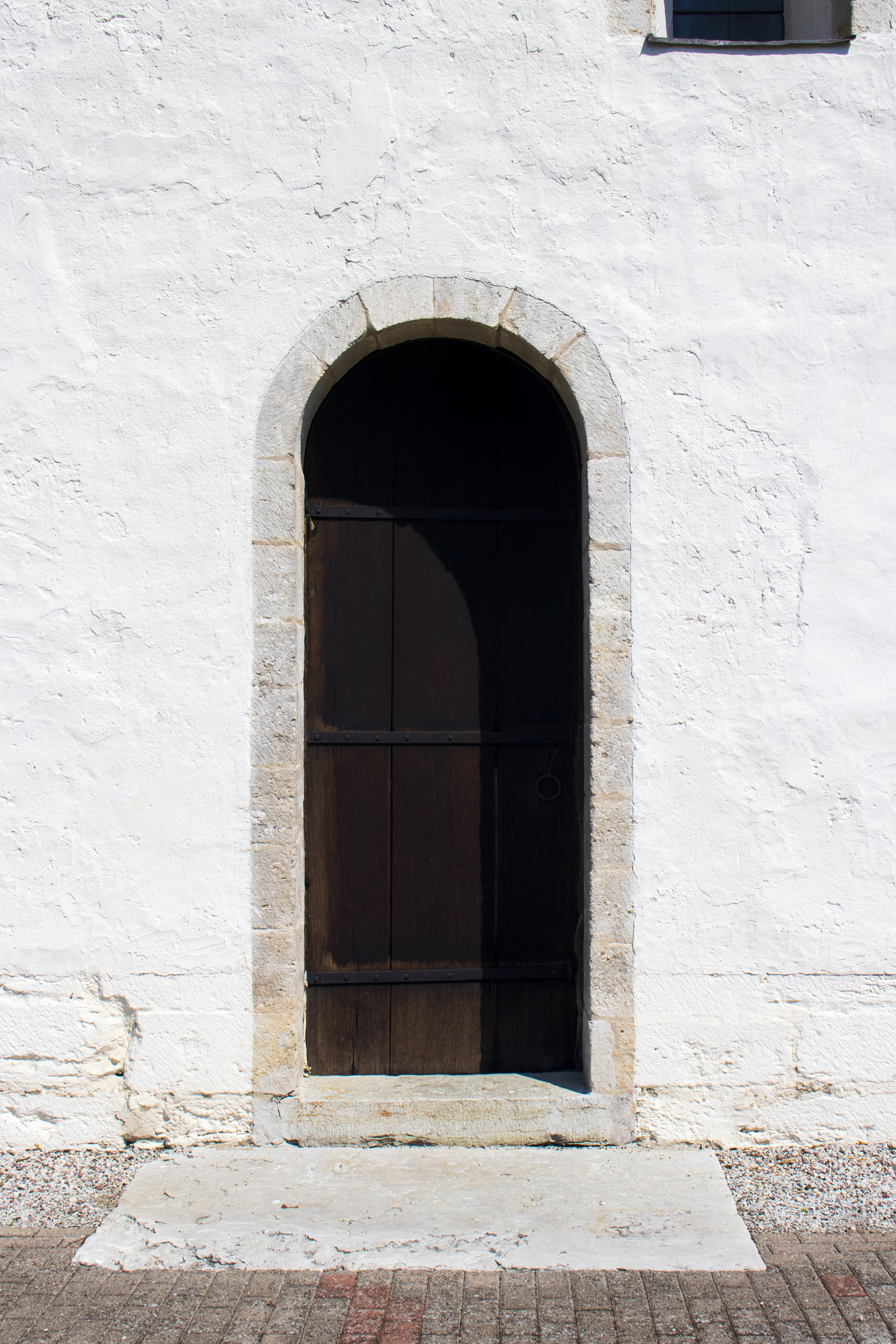
The simple round arched southern portal of the nave, typical for the oldest churches on Gotland

The present church at Garde was possibly preceded by a wooden church, as indicated by holes beneath the floor which may have intended for wooden posts. These were found during an excavation in 1968. It is known that several other churches on Gotland were preceded by wooden churches. It is also possible that the roof trusses of the church came from an earlier wooden church. Any conclusive evidence of an earlier wooden church is however lacking.

The presently visible stone church is regardless one of the oldest churches on Gotland. Construction possibly began around 1130. A document from the Diocese of Linköping, to which Gotland belonged during the Middle Ages, contains a note about an inaugural service in the year 1200. This church would have consisted of a tower, nave, and chancel with an apse. The only surviving part of this first stone church is the nave. Characteristic for the earliest churches on Gotland is the less finely hewn stone used as building material, the lack of an articulated base or plinth, and the simple round arched entrance portals, all elements found in the nave of Garde Church. The baptismal font and triumphal cross still in the church are from the same time and were probably acquired in connection with its inauguration.

The tower was raised to its current height at the middle of the 13th century. During the first half of the 14th century, the earlier chancel was replaced by the current, disproportionately large chancel and sacristy. The intention was probably to rebuild the whole church, as indicated by the provisional walls that still connect the choir and the nave. The new choir was built by a workshop known by the notname Egypticus.

The church was equipped with a new ceiling in the 1690s, and most of the interior covered with whitewash in 1701. Some reconstruction works were carried out in 1869, during which the last medieval stained glass windows probably disappeared. A thorough renovation was carried out in 1963–68, during which fragments of medieval wall paintings in the nave were uncovered. Another renovation was done in 2004, when the tower was repaired and the exterior repainted.

== Architecture ==
=== Exterior ===
The building material of Garde Church is limestone of grey shades, and brick, which is used exclusively in a few decorative elements in the tower facade. The church is whitewashed, except the portals, the corners of the chancel, nave and tower, and the plinths of the tower and the chancel — these are made of more carefully hewn limestone. The church has four entrances, three of which (in the tower, and one on each side of the nave) are simple, Romanesque portals. The northern portal of the nave may originally have been the entrance to the now vanished first chancel, and moved to its current location when the church was rebuilt in the 14th century. The southern portal of the chancel is Gothic in style. The portal opening is stepped inwards with three columns on each side in the angles. The capitals are decorated with plant ornaments with faint traces of original paint. The tympanum above the portal is decorated with a sculpture of a sitting Christ with one hand resting on a book and the other raised in a gesture of blessing. The nave has six windows, of which four are medieval and of a simple, round arched design. The chancel has two large, pointed Gothic windows with tracery. These are of a type also found in Väte, Grötlingbo and Hablingbo churches.

The tower has three storeys in addition to the top floor containing the church bell. The bell was, according to an inscription upon, it made in Lübeck in 1608 and later re-cast in Stockholm. Before the tower has enlarged in the 13th century, there were four sound openings at a lower level. After the heightening of the tower, there are now in total twelve comparatively tall openings with pointed arches, three on each side of the tower. The combination of limestone and brick in their decoration is similar to the openings in the church towers at Lye and Burs.

=== Interior ===
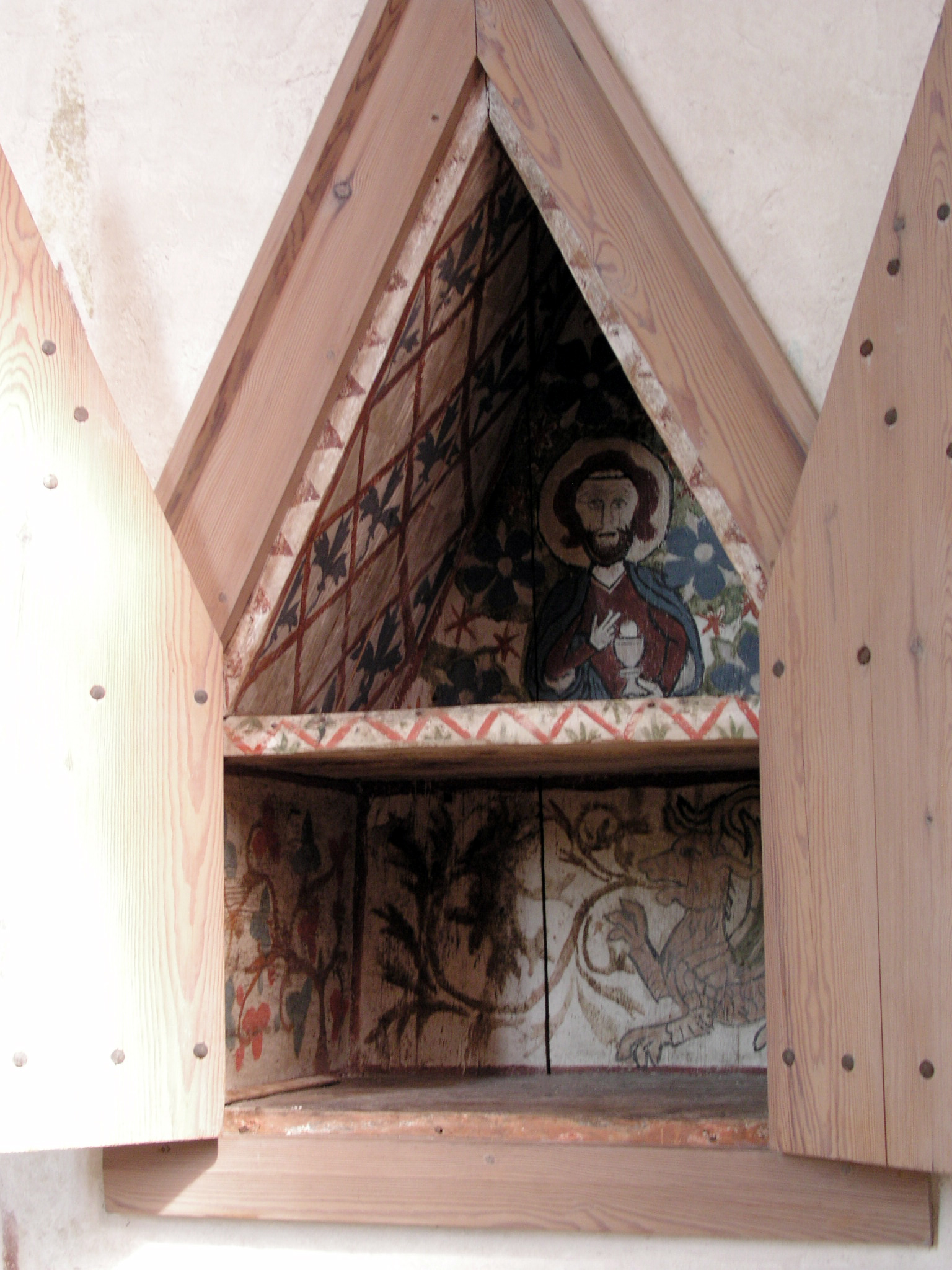
The former church tabernacle, 14th century. The wooden doors are modern.

The church interior is divided into three main spaces: the ground floor of the tower to the west, the nave in the middle and the chancel to the east. The tower ground floor is comparatively small and dark, and connected with the nave with a narrow but tall decorated arch. The nave has highly placed, small windows, while the larger chancel gets its light from the large Gothic windows in the eastern and southern walls. The chancel arch connecting the nave and chancel is made of finely cut limestone. The ceilings of the nave and the tower ground floor are flat, wooden ceilings, while the chancel is covered with its original vault. Above the ceiling of the nave, and under the current roof, old well-made Romanesque roof trusses are preserved. The floor of the church largely dates from the renovation in the 1960s. At that time, fragments of several picture stones were found in the original floor. Some of these have been placed next to the southern wall of the church. There are five niches in the walls of the chancel, dating from the construction period. The largest one of these is a niche with a seat in the southern wall of the chancel, the interior of which is decorated with a painting from the 14th century. The painting depicts Christ seated on a throne. On the northern wall of the choir there is a smaller niche that originally served as a tabernacle, which also contains decorations from the 14th century. The inside of the walls of the church contains a number of carvings, both runic inscriptions and depictions of ships, the latter probably from the late Middle Ages. No original stained glass remains in the church, though the chancel windows still contained medieval stained glass panes in the 1860s.

==== Murals ====
The entire nave was probably originally decorated with murals, but most of these have vanished. One set of murals, on the soffit of the arch connecting the nave to the ground floor of the tower, is however still very well preserved and have never been covered. These are Russo-Byzantine in style, with some influences from Gothic art discernible in the purely ornamental details. They are recognised as being of high quality and have been called "the best evidence of a byzantinizing workshop on Gotland and as such are justly celebrated". It has been suggested that there is a relationship with fragmentary paintings in Källunge and Havdhem churches, but otherwise no comparable paintings exist in Sweden. They were probably made c. 1200.

The wall paintings depict two male saints standing under arches decorated with palmettes, supported by pillars with decorated capitals. Each saint is standing upright, tending towards contrapposto, and faces the viewer, with the left hand raised in a blessing gesture and the other holding a cross. They are richly dressed in Byzantine dress. This way of representing saints is known from Russia and also from other areas (e.g. St Mark's Basilica in Venice), but always from areas under Byzantine influence. It has been suggested that they depict the saints Florus and Laurus, and the similarities with a similar depiction of these saints in the Church of Agioi Anargyroi in Kastoria, Greece, has been noted.

Several efforts have been made to identify from where the stylistic influences of these murals may come, and to speculate about the origins or identity of the artist who made them. The first art historian to point out their relation to Byzantine art was Johnny Roosval in 1911. The following year, a first attempt at finding stylistic parallels in Russian art was made by Ture J. Arne, who suggested a link between the paintings at Garde and the murals in the Russian churches of Nereditsa and St. George in Staraya Ladoga. Later research has also highlighted the similarities with St. George's Church in Staraya Ladoga. The exact nature of the link between these Russian churches and the paintings at Garde remains an open question. It is known that there was a Russian church in Visby (now a ruin) and it is possible that a Russian artist went to Gotland to decorate this church, and at the same time decorated the church at Garde. It may also be that traders from Gotland brought a Russian artist to Gotland from the eastern coast of the Baltic Sea. Furthermore, it has been pointed out that the paintings also display possible direct influences from Greek and Sicilian art, as well as Western art, which further complicates any definitive judgment on the origins of the artist who made them. This mixture of influences has led to the hypothesis that the artist was trained in a Russo-Byzantine environment but also worked using illuminated manuscripts as pattern books. Contemporary parallels with Russian and Byzantine illuminated manuscripts have also been pointed out. Wherever the artist may have found the inspiration, it has been underlined that the church was built as a Catholic, and not as an Orthodox church; similarly to the churches of 12th-century Sicily, the artistic influences were derived from Orthodox art "despite doctrinal and liturgical differences".

Russo-Byzantine paintings

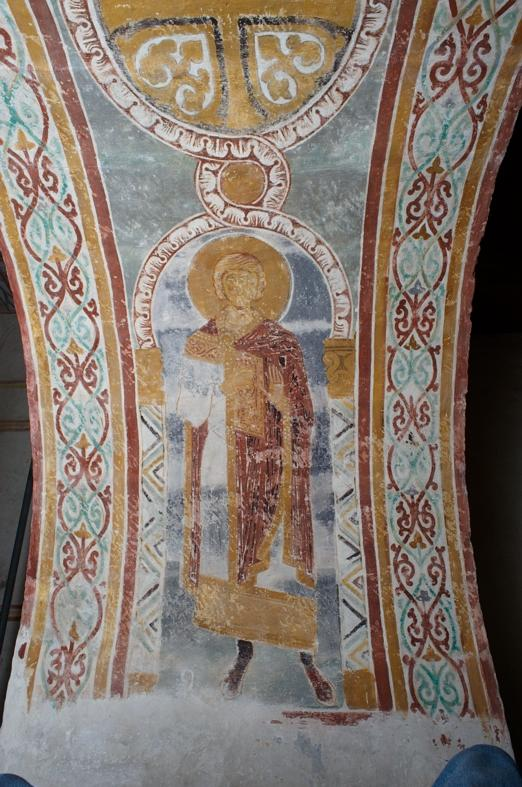
Male saint, southern side

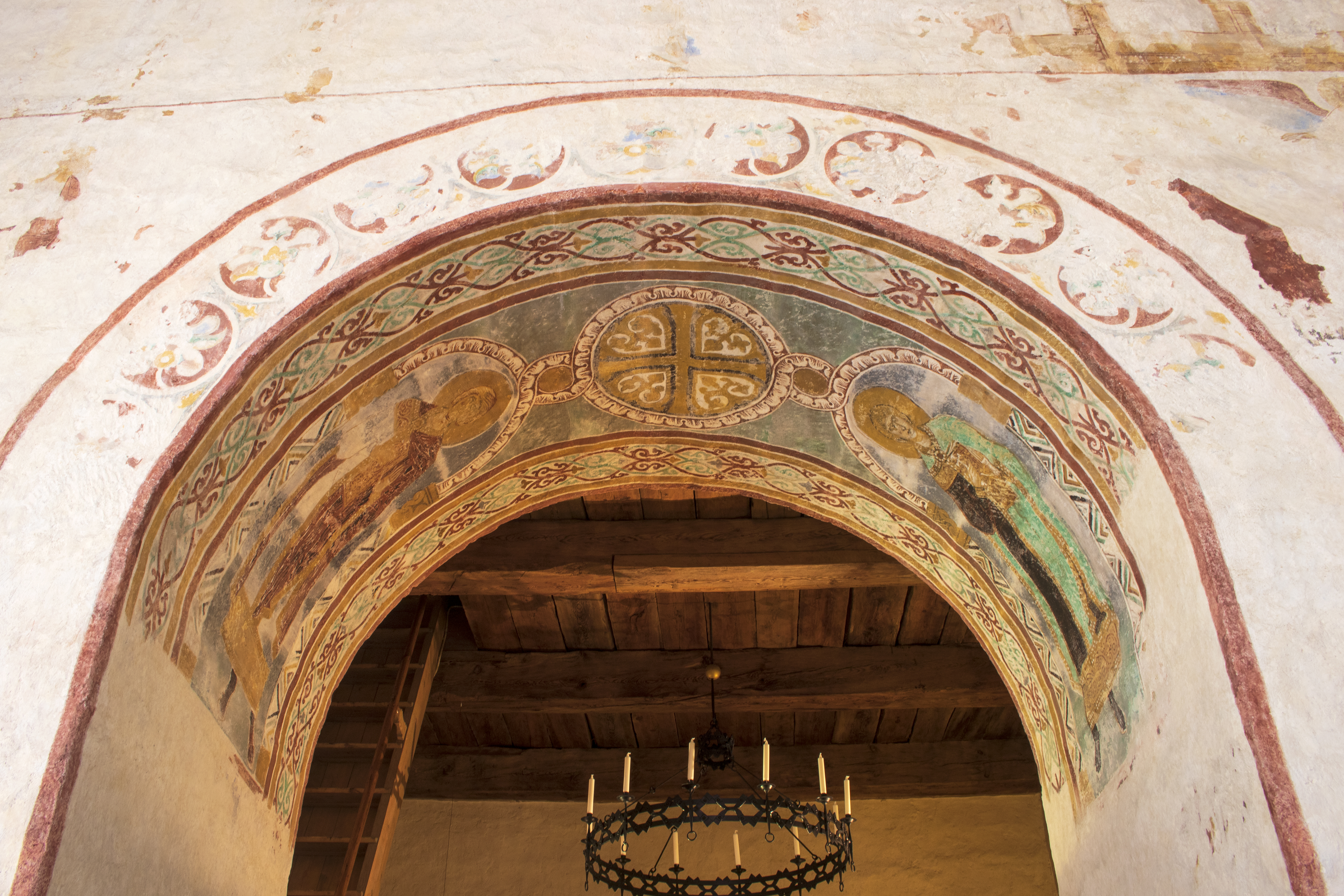
The arch with the paintings

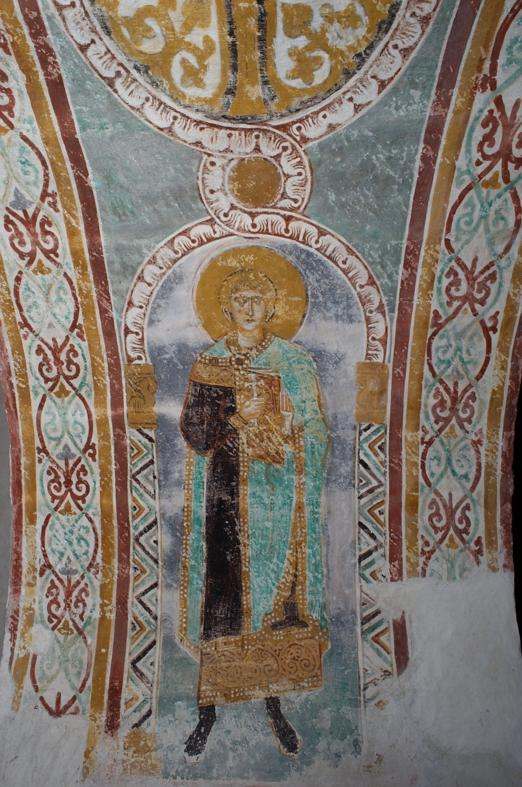
Male saint, northern side

== Furnishings ==
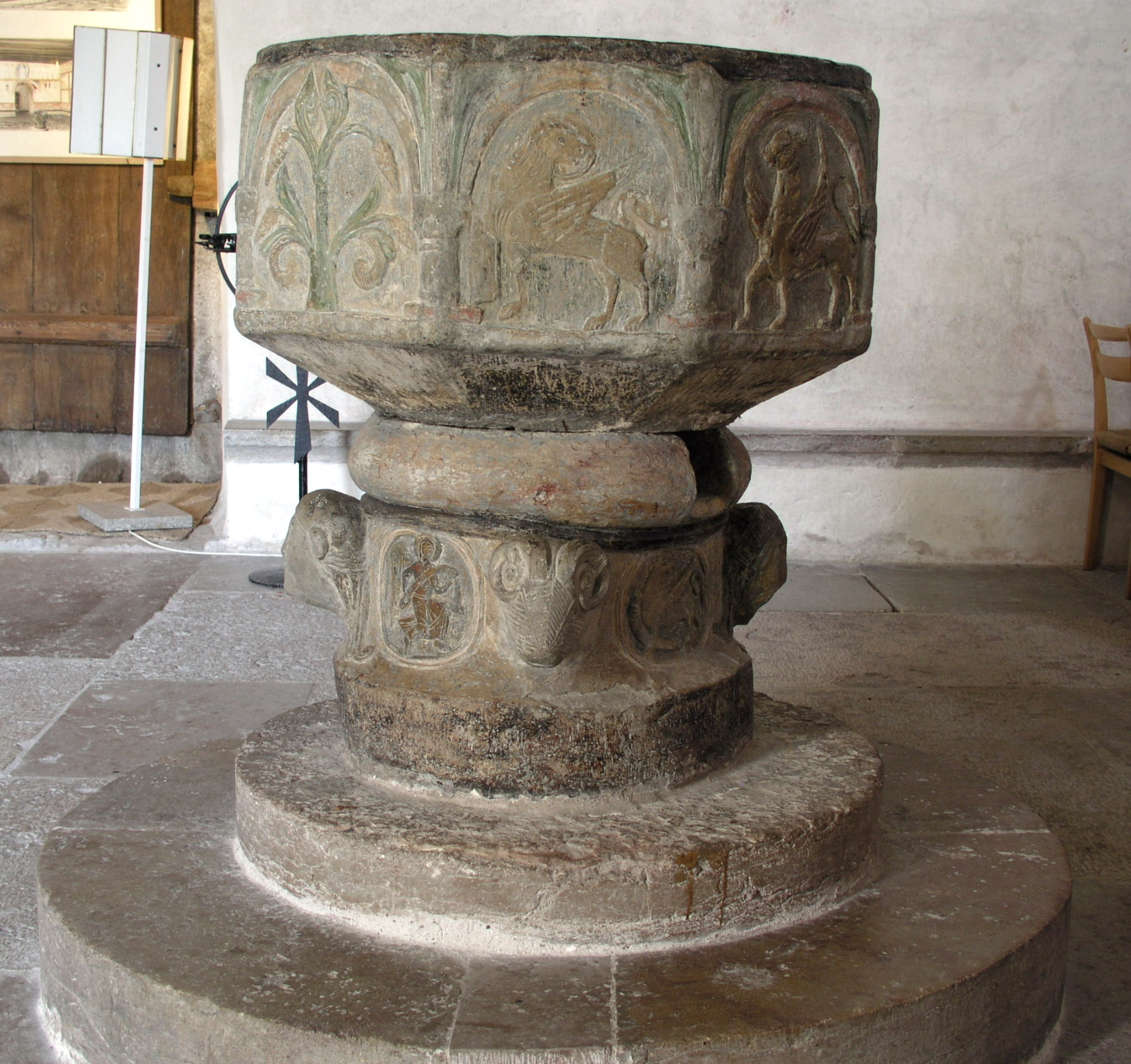
The baptismal font, a work by Byzantios (late 12th century)

The baptismal font of the church dates from the late 12th century and is made by an artist or workshop known by the notname Byzantios. Baptismal fonts similar to the one in Garde exist in Atlingbo and Hogrän churches. Like all baptismal fonts by Byzantios, it has an octagonal basin, decorated with figures in low relief between short columns supporting round arches. Traces of the original paint still remain on the base of the baptismal font; the paint discernible on the basin dates from the middle of the 18th century. The altarpiece of Garde Church is made of sculpted and painted limestone, and dates from 1689, or possibly 1682. Its central section depicts the Last Supper, and is flanked by two sculptures of Moses and Aaron. On top is the monogram of King Charles XI of Sweden. The pulpit was made in 1662, and probably painted in its current colours in 1749. The present pews were installed during the 1960s. The triumphal cross of the church consists of a sculpture of Christ, probably made around 1200, mounted on a cross of later date – likely from the 18th century. The crown is a modern replica made with the triumphal cross in Lokrume Church as a model. It is approximately 250 centimetres (98 in) tall and 180 centimetres (71 in) wide.

== Current use and heritage status ==
Garde Church belongs to Garde parish within Sudertredingens kontrakt, (Note: A "kontrakt" within the Church of Sweden is approximately equivalent to a rural deanery.) itself part of the Diocese of Visby within the Church of Sweden. Garde Church is an ecclesiastical monument, number 21300000002676 (sub-number: 21400000444025) in the buildings database of the Swedish National Heritage Board. In 2019, Garde Church was one of the first 56 cultural heritage monuments on Gotland and in Sweden to be explicitly marked with the blue and white shield of the Hague Convention for the Protection of Cultural Property in the Event of Armed Conflict.

== Bibliography ==
=== General ===
- Andrén, Anders (2011). Det Medeltida Gotland. En arkeologisk guidebok (in Swedish). Lund: Historiska Media. ISBN 978-91-85873-83-8.
- Jacobsson, Britta; Johansson, Eva; Johansson, Per; Andersson, Rolf (1990). Våra kyrkor. Västervik: Klarkullens förlag AB. ISBN 91-971561-08.
- Jonsson, Marita; Lindquist, Sven-Olof (1987). Vägen till kulturen på Gotland (in Swedish). Visby: Gotlands fornsal. ISBN 91-971048-1-7.
- Lagerlöf, Erland (1972). Garde kyrka (PDF). Sveriges kyrkor, konsthistoriskt inventarium (in Swedish). Vol. 145. Stockholm: Almqvist & Wiksell. ISSN 0284-1894.
- Trotzig, Gustaf (1970). "En arkeologisk undersökning i Garda kyrka på Gotland" (PDF). Fornvännen. Journal of Swedish Antiquarian Research: 1–17. Archived from the original (PDF) on 21 March 2020.

=== Murals ===
- Arne, Ture J. (1912). "Rysk-byzantinska målningar i en gotlandskyrka" (PDF). Fornvännen. Journal of Swedish Antiquarian Research (in Swedish): 57–64. Archived from the original (PDF) on 19 March 2020.
- Cutler, Anthony (1969). "Garda, Källunge, and the Byzantine Tradition on Gotland". The Art Bulletin. 51 (3): 257–266. doi:10.2307/3048630. JSTOR 3048630.
- Tuulse, Armin (1971). "Väst och öst i Gotlands romanik" (PDF). Fornvännen. Journal of Swedish Antiquarian Research (in Swedish): 154–172. Archived from the original (PDF) on 16 January 2021.
