= Byzantios =

Romanesque sculptor or workshop in Gotland

Byzantios is the notname of a Romanesque stone sculptor or workshop, working on Gotland in present-day Sweden during the last quarter of the 12th century. Byzantios was the first of a series of Romanesque stone sculpture workshops active on Gotland. Around a dozen decorated baptismal fonts from this time are so similar in style and execution that art historians have assumed they have the same origin. The artist has thus been labelled Byzantios. However, they may also have been made by a workshop and not by a single individual. Likewise, the origins and precise artistic roots of Byzantios are not known, but there is a general agreement on that the art of Byzantios show influences from Byzantine art of the period; hence the notname.

== Identity ==
Byzantios is a notname that in strict terms refers to a group of stone sculptures from the late 12th century. Whether these were produced by a single sculptor, a workshop, or a workshop with an artistic leader has been a matter of debate since the notname was used for the first time. It was coined by art historian Johnny Roosval, who wrote that the use of a notname was simply a more convenient way of referring to the group of sculptures. Nonetheless, Roosval referred to Byzantios as "he" and "the master" when writing about the subject. Some later researchers have consciously tried to avoid such individualisation and the use of individual notnames at all. Art historian Jan Svanberg has tried to strike a balance, arguing that it may be reasonable to assume that there was a workshop consisting of several artisans behind the notname Byzantios, but also an artistic leader who was instrumental in conveying a particular character on the works from that workshop. Svetlana Svensson of Stockholm University chooses the simply refer to Byzantios as a "sculpture workshop".

== Stylistic origins ==
Byzantios was the first of a series of stone sculptors working on Gotland during the Romanesque period of Scandinavian art history. As the notname implies, an influence from Byzantine art characterises the style of Byzantios. It has therefore been proposed that Byzantios was from, or at the very least received training in, north-eastern Italy. Byzantios could have worked on the building site of Lund Cathedral and possibly also at Dalby Church. Eventually the artist or workshop moved to Gotland and was active there in producing baptismal fonts and architectural details on churches. It was a time when many stone churches were being built on Gotland. Another suggestion is that Byzantios originally came from Germany, where art displayed a strong Byzantine influence at the time. Others have argued that there is a more direct influence of Byzantine art and suggest that the workshop consisted of Russian artists. Stylistic comparisons have been made with the sculpture adorning the Cathedral of Saint Demetrius in Vladimir and the Church of the Intercession on the Nerl. Svetlana Svensson has criticised this theory, arguing that the Russian churches show a clear pictorial programme, aimed at glorifying local rulers, which is completely absent in the work of Byzantios. She instead suggests that the leader of the workshop came from somewhere in Western Europe, while the rest of the workshop was recruited locally on Gotland.

== Style ==
After Byzantios a sequence of other stone sculptors, also mostly producing baptismal fonts, worked on Gotland, e.g. Majestatis, Hegvald and Sigraf. The style of Byzantios is easily recognisable in comparison. The basins of the fonts made by Byzantios are always octagonal and the bases are always round. Without exception, the bases are decorated by four protruding, sculpted heads of respectively a human, a ram, a lion and what is probably supposed to be a panther.

The eight sides of the basins are decorated with one or sometimes two isolated subjects, either a human, a beast or a plant, cut in low relief. The subjects appear without any particular connection to each other; in fact the lack of any overarching theme or iconographic programme has been described as a main characteristic of the style of Byzantios. A degree of such fragmentation of themes and subjects was not uncommon among Western European Romanesque artists at the time. Despite this lack of a precise subject matter or narrative, it has been suggested that an overarching theme is the conflict between good and evil. These fields are framed by short columns supporting rounded arches.

The imagery is clearly influenced by Byzantine art, although as noted very probably second hand in one form or another. For example, the treatment of the subject of the Annunciation is depicted with Mary spinning yarn for the veil at the temple, a typically Byzantine way of representing the scene. Like the case is with the Annunciation, some subjects derive from the Bible. In addition, animals and legendary creatures (including the first depictions of both elephants and camels in Swedish art history) are also popular subjects. Whether or not Byzantios had access to and used a pattern book, perhaps in the form of an illuminated manuscript, is a matter of diverging opinions. Byzantios was furthermore the first artist in the Nordic countries who portrayed human beings in a reasonably correct anatomical way. Two of the fonts attributed to Byzanrios, at Garde and Hejde churches, retain traces of original paint. Others have been painted in later centuries.

== Works ==
Most works of art attributed to Byzantios are decorated baptismal fonts. Around a dozen such fonts have been attributed Byzantios, as well as some bases of fonts whose upper parts have been lost. Some of these attributions are not generally agreed upon, and as to whether or not Byzantios also made other works, notably the friezes on the facade of Vänge Church, is a matter of debate. All attributed works, with the possible exception of the base of the baptismal font in Dalby, are located on Gotland.

The following list of works attributed to Byzantios is based on the original enumeration of works done by Roosval, and on the later enumerations made by Svanberg and Svensson.

=== List of works attributed to Byzantios ===
Type of sculpture	Location	Image	Notes and references
Baptismal font	Atlingbo Church		Attributed to Byzantios by Roosval, Svanberg and Svensson.
Baptismal font (possibly only the base)	Dalby Church		Attributed to Byzantios only by Svanberg.
Baptismal font	Eskelhem Church		Attributed to Byzantios by Roosval, Svanberg and Svensson.
Baptismal font	Garde Church		Attributed to Byzantios by Roosval, Svanberg and Svensson.
Baptismal font	Guldrupe Church		Attributed to Byzantios by Roosval, Svanberg and Svensson.
Baptismal font	Hejde Church		Attributed to Byzantios by Roosval, Svanberg and Svensson.
Baptismal font	Hogrän Church		Attributed to Byzantios by Roosval, Svanberg and Svensson.
Baptismal font (only the base)	Källunge Church		Attributed to Byzantios by Roosval, Svanberg and Svensson.
Baptismal font (only the base)	Levide Church		Attributed to Byzantios by Roosval and Svanberg. Not mentioned by Svensson.
Baptismal font	Mästerby Church		Explicitly attributed to Byzantios Svensson. In enumerating the works by Byzantios, Roosval does not mention Mästerby; however he mentions the baptismal font at Mästerby later in the article. Svanberg does not mention Mästerby.
Baptismal font	Sanda Church		Attributed to Byzantios by Roosval, Svanberg and Svensson.
Baptismal font	Träkumla Church		Attributed to Byzantios by Roosval, Svanberg and Svensson.
Baptismal font	Vamlingbo Church		Attributed to Byzantios by Roosval, Svanberg and Svensson.
Frieze	Vänge Church		Attributed to Byzantios by Roosval and Svanberg. Svensson notes that the attribution is disputed.
Baptismal font	Väte Church		Attributed to Byzantios by Roosval, Svanberg and Svensson.
Baptismal font	Öja Church (now in Gotland Museum, Visby)		Attributed to Byzantios by Roosval, Svanberg and Svensson.

== Bibliography ==
- Hourihane, Colum, ed. (2012). "Romanesque sculpture I: stone.". 11. Scandinavia. The Grove Encyclopedia of Medieval Art and Architecture. OUP USA. pp. 349–351. ISBN 978-0195395365.
- Roosval, Johnny (1916). "Byzantios eller en gotländsk stenmästare på 1100-talet" (PDF). Fornvännen. Journal of Swedish Antiquarian Research (in Swedish): 220–237.
- Svanberg, Jan (1995). "Stenskulpturen". In Karlsson, Lennart (ed.). Den romanska konsten. Signums svenska konsthistoria (in Swedish). Signum. pp. 116–227. ISBN 91-87896-23-0.
- Svensson, Svetlana (2016). "»Byzantios» stenmästarverkstad och dess stilistiska omvärld" (PDF). Fornvännen. Journal of Swedish Antiquarian Research (in Swedish and English) (111): 243–255.
