= Vamlingbo Church =

- Vamlingbo kyrka
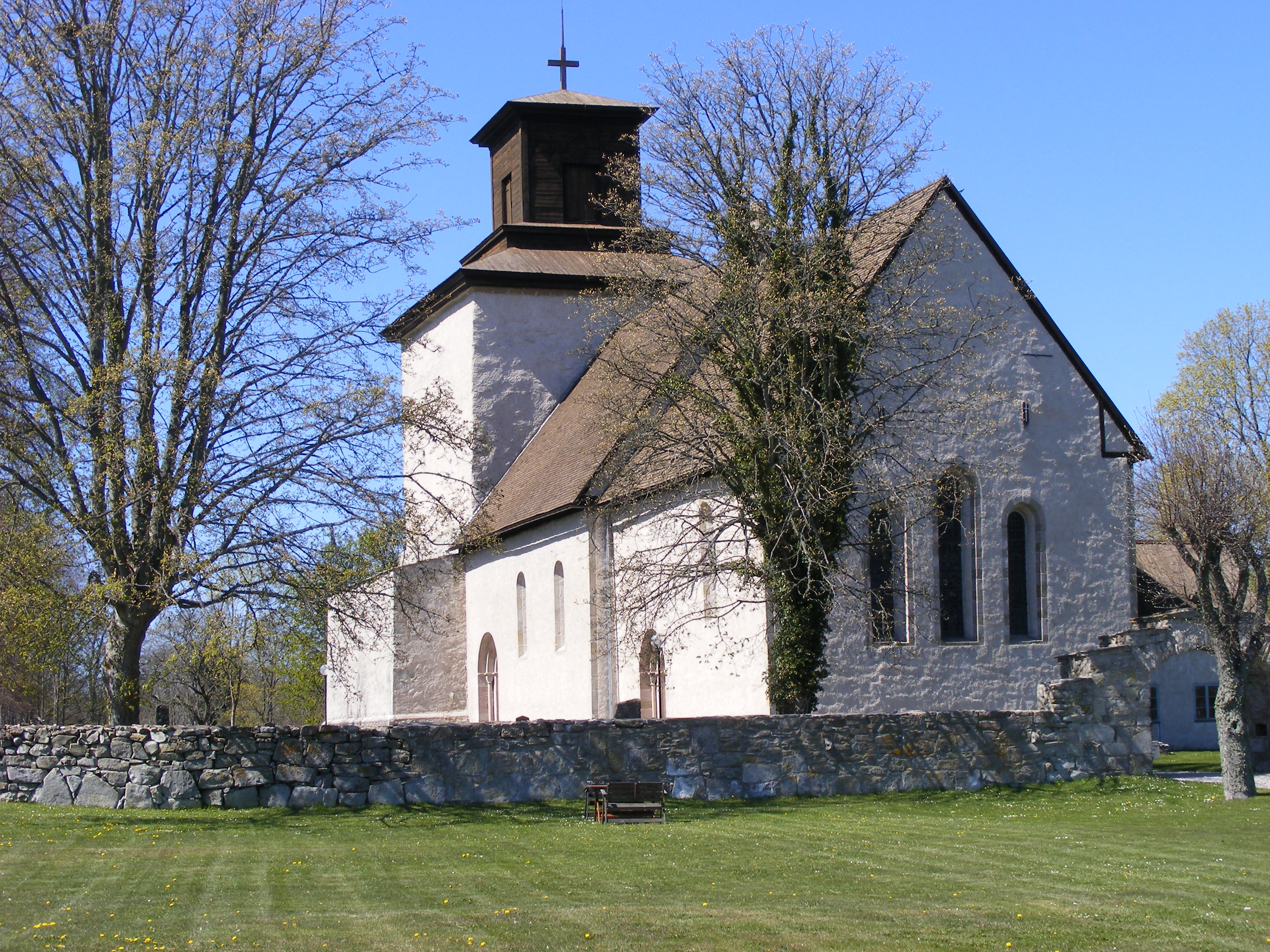
- Vamlingbo Church, view of the exterior

- Location on Gotland
- 56°58′11″N 18°13′49″E
- Country: Sweden
- Denomination: Church of Sweden

Administration
- Diocese: Visby

Vamlingbo Church (Swedish: Vamlingbo kyrka) is a medieval church on the Swedish island of Gotland, and one of the largest on the island. It lies in the Diocese of Visby.

== History ==
The earliest church on the site was a stave church, later replaced by a Romanesque stone church. Of these first churches nothing remains, except for some Romanesque reliefs incorporated in the southern wall of the present church, and the baptismal font, made by the master sculptor known through the notname as Byzantios.

The presently visible church is a comparatively large Gothic building, dating from the middle of the 14th century. Only the tower is later, built during the 14th century. It was around 75 meters tall and the tallest tower in Gotland. But it was heavily damaged by a lightning strike in 1817. The upper part of the tower, including the roof lantern, therefore dates from 1820.

The church is one of the largest churches on Gotland, which is probably because the large parish was at the time one of the richest on Gotland. It is however also possible that the unusual size of the church can be explained by that the church, like Lau Church, may have been used by Dominican friars to preach crusades against pagans in present-day Estonia and Latvia.

No major alterations have been made to the church since. Archaeological investigations and a renovation was carried out in 1960 to 1961.

== Architecture ==
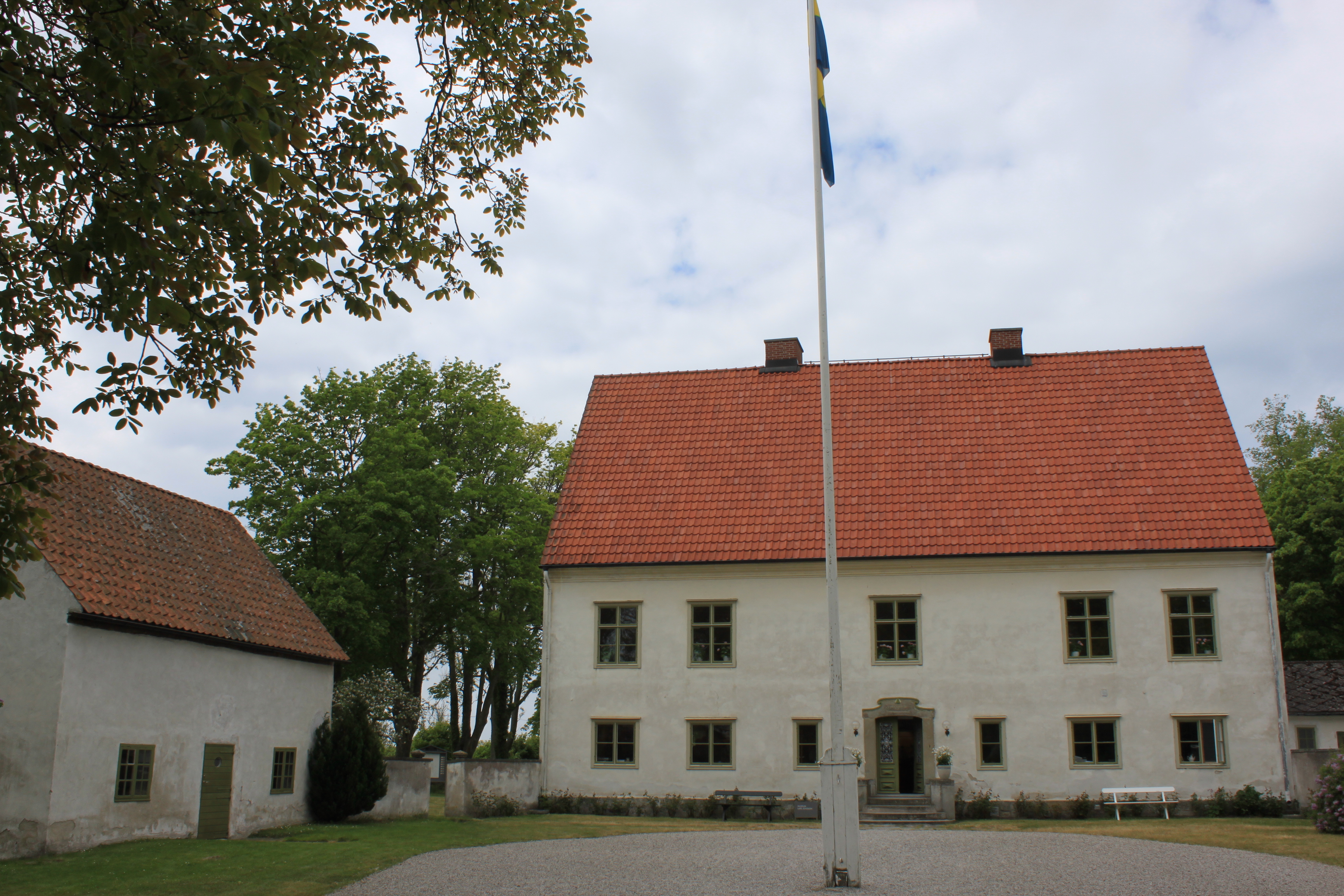
Vamlingbo church rectory

The church is a hall church of a type quite common on Gotland. The nave of the church is spacious and broad, divided into three parts by four sturdy pillars. The stone masons that built the church have alternated red and grey limestone in the pillars and other details, creating an unusually colourful interior.

On its northern wall are a set of medieval muralss, depicting a scene in which the archangel Michael is weighing the soul of Emperor Henry. The picture dates from the middle of the 13th century and is considered to be one of the largest and most unusual murals on Gotland. It has been suggested that St. Michael was the patron saint of the church.

Another significant fresco is the large image of Saint Christopher on the right-hand wall of the choir. The saint is shown carrying the Christ Child across a river, its waters teeming with fish and monstrous creatures, including a mermaid. Dating from the 14th century, the fresco invites the faithful toward conversion through a symbolic journey with sacramental overtones, evoking both baptism and the Eucharist.

Other, less dominating murals in the church depict pictures of saints and apostles, and purely decorative painting.

Of furnishings, the aforementioned baptismal font is perhaps the most noteworthy. The altarpiece is from the 14th century and shows influences from western German art.

=== Rectory ===
Adjacent to the church is the former rectory. It is an unusually grand building, consisting in a small manor-like complex with four annexes and a large main house. The house, which is located on the site of an earlier, medieval rectory, dates from 1779 and show traces of a simple, vernacular form of Rococo.
