= Havdhem Church =

- Havdhem kyrka
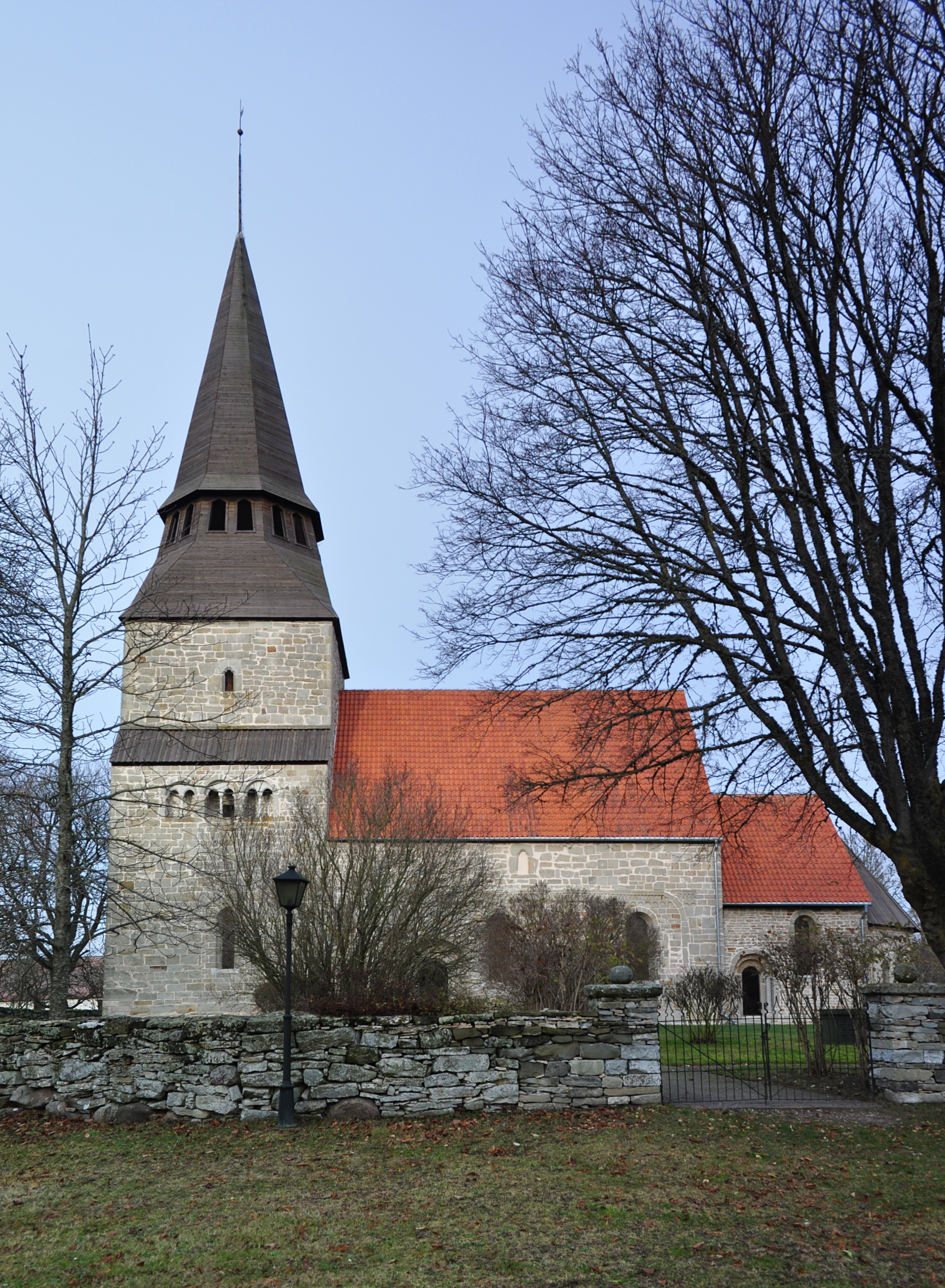
- Havdhem Church, view of the exterior

- Location on Gotland
- 57°09′45″N 18°19′24″E
- Country: Sweden
- Denomination: Church of Sweden

Administration
- Diocese: Visby

Havdhem Church (Swedish: Havdhems kyrka) is a medieval church in Havdhem on the Swedish island of Gotland. Built during the 12th and 13th centuries, it contains fragments of murals showing influences from Byzantine art. Havdhem Church belongs to the Diocese of Visby.

== History and architecture ==
While the oldest parts of Havdhem Church have been identified as being from the first half of the 12th century, graves dating from the period of the arrival of Christendom to Gotland (11th century) have been discovered in the cemetery. The choir is the oldest part of the church and shows resemblances with the churches of Garde and Källunge. The choir portal is however later, from the 13th century. The nave dates from circa 1200 but was originally both lower and somewhat shorter. It was possibly enlarged in 1580, following a fire that devastated the church. The apse was added to the choir at approximately the same time as the nave was built. It displays similarities with a now ruined church in Visby, St. Drotten. The church tower dates from the middle of the 13th century and was originally slightly higher. It replaced an earlier, smaller tower.

Internally, the apse retains a few fragments of murals displaying Byzantine influences. The altarpiece dates from 1667 and the pulpit from 1679, while the baptismal font is from 1685. The triumphal cross is a work from the 15th century.
