= Sven-Bernhard Fast =

The Right Reverend Sven-Bernhard Fast
- Bishop Emeritus of Visby
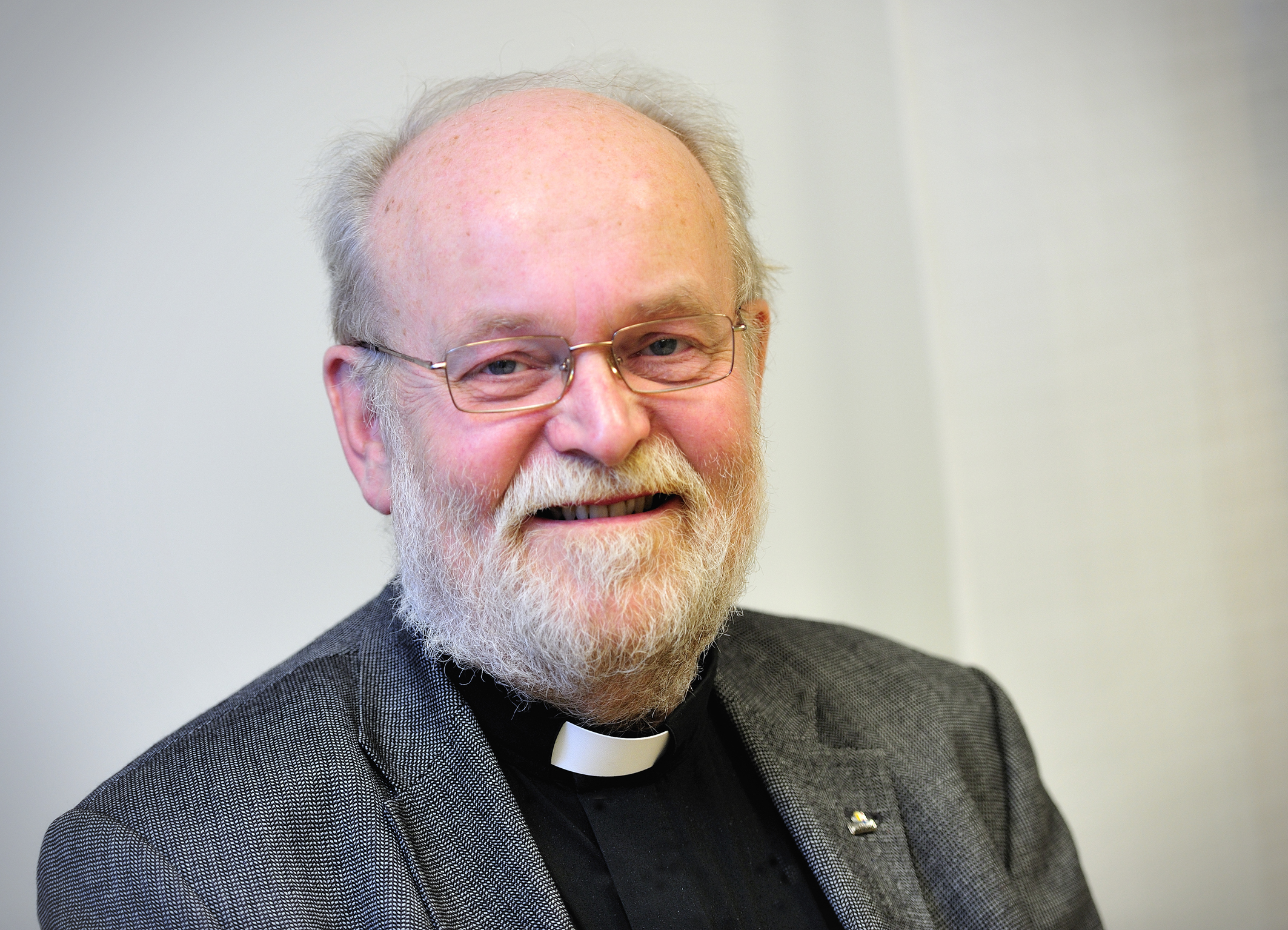
- Church: Church of Sweden
- Diocese: Visby
- Elected: December 2010
- In office: 2011–2018
- Predecessor: Lennart Koskinen
- Successor: Thomas Petersson

Orders
- Ordination: 1973
- Consecration: 6 March 2011 by Anders Wejryd

Personal details
- Born: 30 May 1951 (age 75) Oskarshamn, Sweden
- Motto: Ut omnes unum sint (that they all shall become one)
- Coat of arms

Sven-Bernhard Fast (born 30 May 1951 in Oskarshamn) is a Swedish prelate who served as Bishop of Visby from 2011 till 2018.

== Biography ==
Fast is the son of construction worker Bernhard Fast and teacher Viveca Olsson. After high school studies in Helsingborg and academic studies in Uppsala, he was ordained priest in 1973 for the Diocese of Luleå. He served as Pastor and Counselor in the Lycksele parish from 1973-1980, priest in the Vaksala parish in Uppsala from 1981-1982, Student Priest in Uppsala 1982-1983, Commissioner and Deputy pastor of the Orsa parish in Västerås University from 1984 to 1989, and a pastor of Ål parish from 1989 till 1992. He was a founder and director of the Stiftsgården in Rättvik 1992-2000 and ecumenical administrator at the church office in Uppsala from 2000 to 2003. Between 2003 and 2011 he was Secretary General of the Swedish Christian Council .

In December 2010, he was elected as bishop of Visby. He was consecrated on 6 March 2011, together with Martin Modéus, the new bishop of Linköping.
