= Thomas Petersson =

Thomas Petersson may refer to:

- Thomas Petersson (actor)
- Thomas Petersson (bishop)
- Tom Petersson (Thomas John Peterson, born 1950), American musician

== See also ==
- Tommy Pettersson (born 1952), Swedish motorcycle speedway rider
- Tomas Pettersson (born 1947), Swedish cyclist
