= Levide Church =

- Levide kyrka
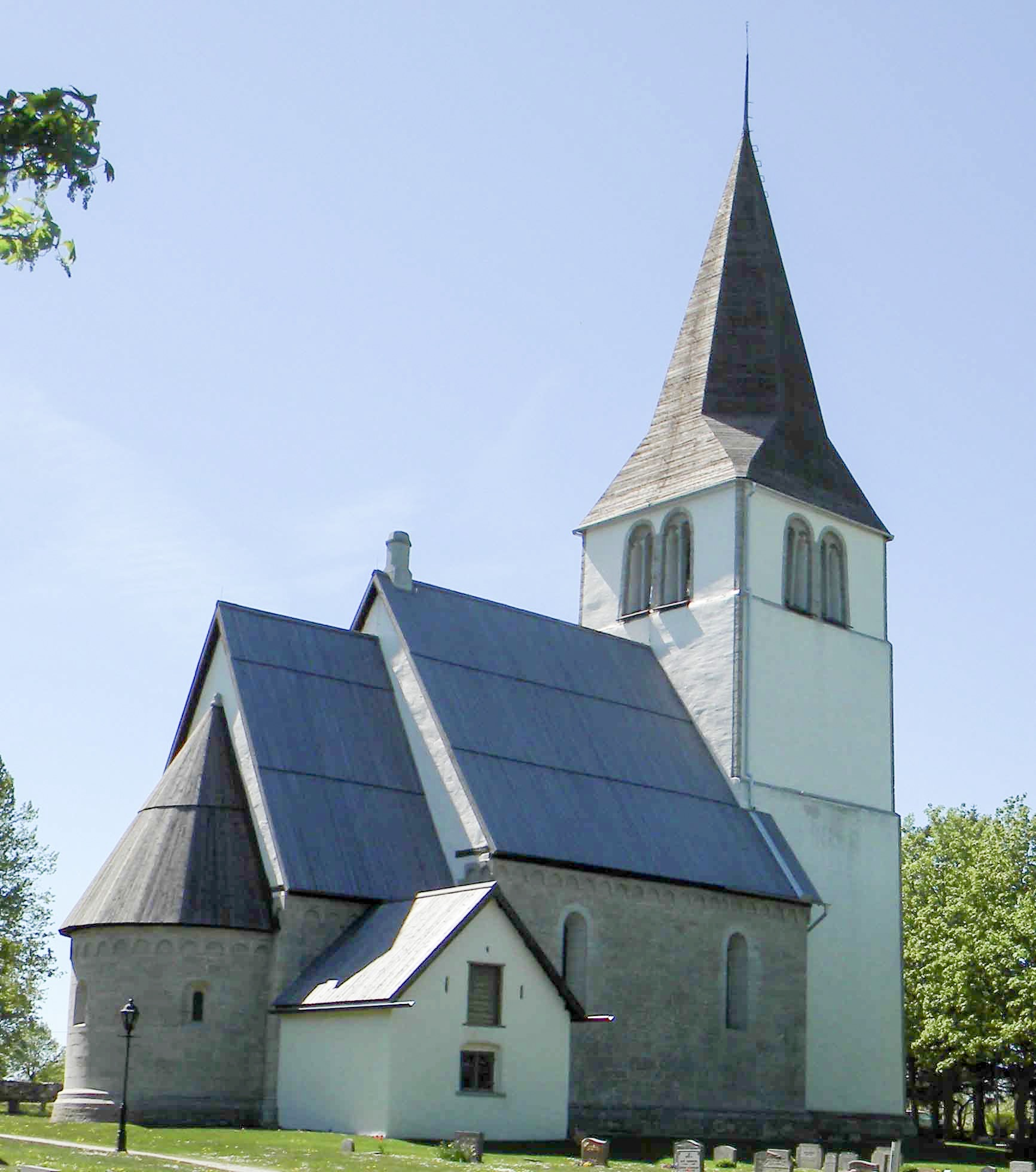
- Levide Church, view of the exterior

- Location on Gotland
- 57°16′56″N 18°15′59″E
- Country: Sweden
- Denomination: Church of Sweden

Levide Church (Swedish: Levide kyrka) is a medieval church on the Swedish island of Gotland. It lies in the Diocese of Visby.

== History and architecture ==
Levide Church is a largely Romanesque church and has a particular style unlike other countryside churches of Gotland. Parts of the choir, notably the area around the portal, is however comparable to the northern portal of Visby Cathedral in Visby, the main town of the island.

The oldest parts of the church are the aforementioned choir with its apse, dating from the late 12th century. The nave dates from the early 13th century while the tower was erected at the middle of the same century. The sacristy is the only part of the church which is not medieval.

The interior is divided into a nave and two aisles, divided by four massive pillars. The ceiling is supported by nine vaults. The interior thus forms a hall church, and the influences for the layout probably came from German churches of the time. A more direct model was probably what is today Visby Cathedral. The southern wall of the interior is decorated by murals, probably from the middle of the 15th century and attributed to the so-called Master of the Passion of Christ. They depict apostles and saints, including the Scandinavian saints Ansgar and Bridget of Sweden. In addition, there are some purely decorative paintings, probably from the 13th century. A medieval processional cross (14th century) is also preserved in the church. Of later date is the altarpiece (1662-63) and a votive ship (1748).
