= Hogrän Church =

- Hogrän kyrka
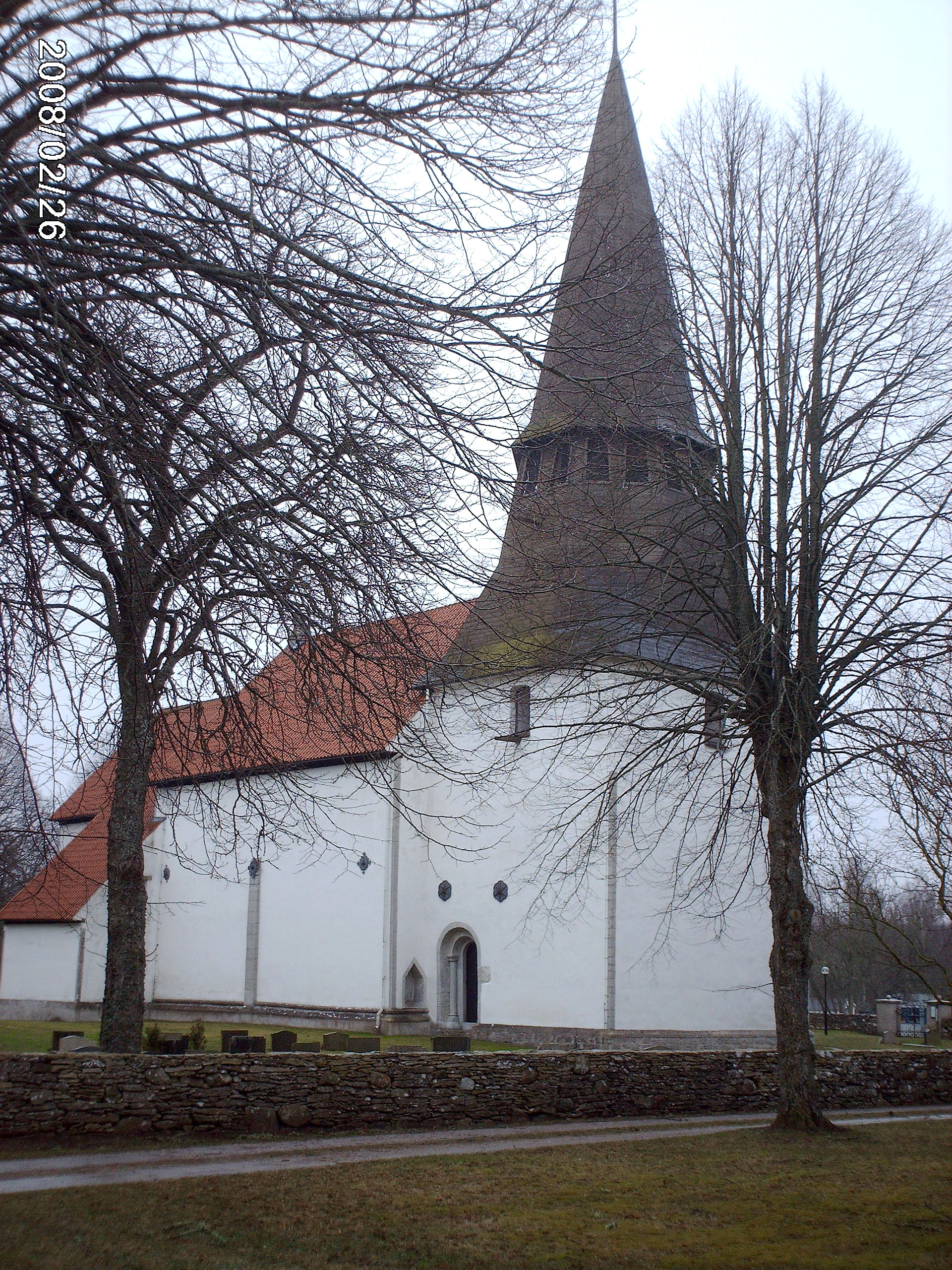
- Hogrän Church, view of the exterior

- Location on Gotland
- 57°30′16″N 18°18′28″E
- Country: Sweden
- Denomination: Church of Sweden

Administration
- Diocese: Visby

Hogrän Church (Swedish: Hogräns kyrka) is a medieval church in Hogrän on the Swedish island of Gotland. It was built in stages between the 12th and 14th century, and contains several medieval church fittings. It belongs to the Church of Sweden and lies in the Diocese of Visby.

== History and architecture ==
Hogrän Church consists of a Romanesque tower and a Gothic nave and choir. The tower thus is the oldest part of the church, dating from circa 1200. Attached to it was originally an earlier stone church, also Romanesque in style and erected during the 12th century. During the 14th century, it was however replaced by the presently visible Gothic nave and choir. A few details from this earlier church, such as a few sculpted reliefs and a Romanesque window-frame, have been incorporated in the Gothic church.

The interior of the church is characterised by the broad width of the nave (10 metres (33 ft)). The church contains a number of medieval items. The triumphal cross is one of the oldest wooden sculptures from Gotland, dating from the 12th century. The finely carved doors of the tabernacle are from the early 15th century, and the door of the sacristy is likewise medieval. The baptismal font, probably a work by the craftsman or workshop known by its notname as Byzantios, is from the late 12th century. Of later date are the altarpiece (1634), the pulpit (1637) and the choir stalls (17th century but with incorporated medieval elements).

The church was renovated in 1953-54.
