= Hejde =

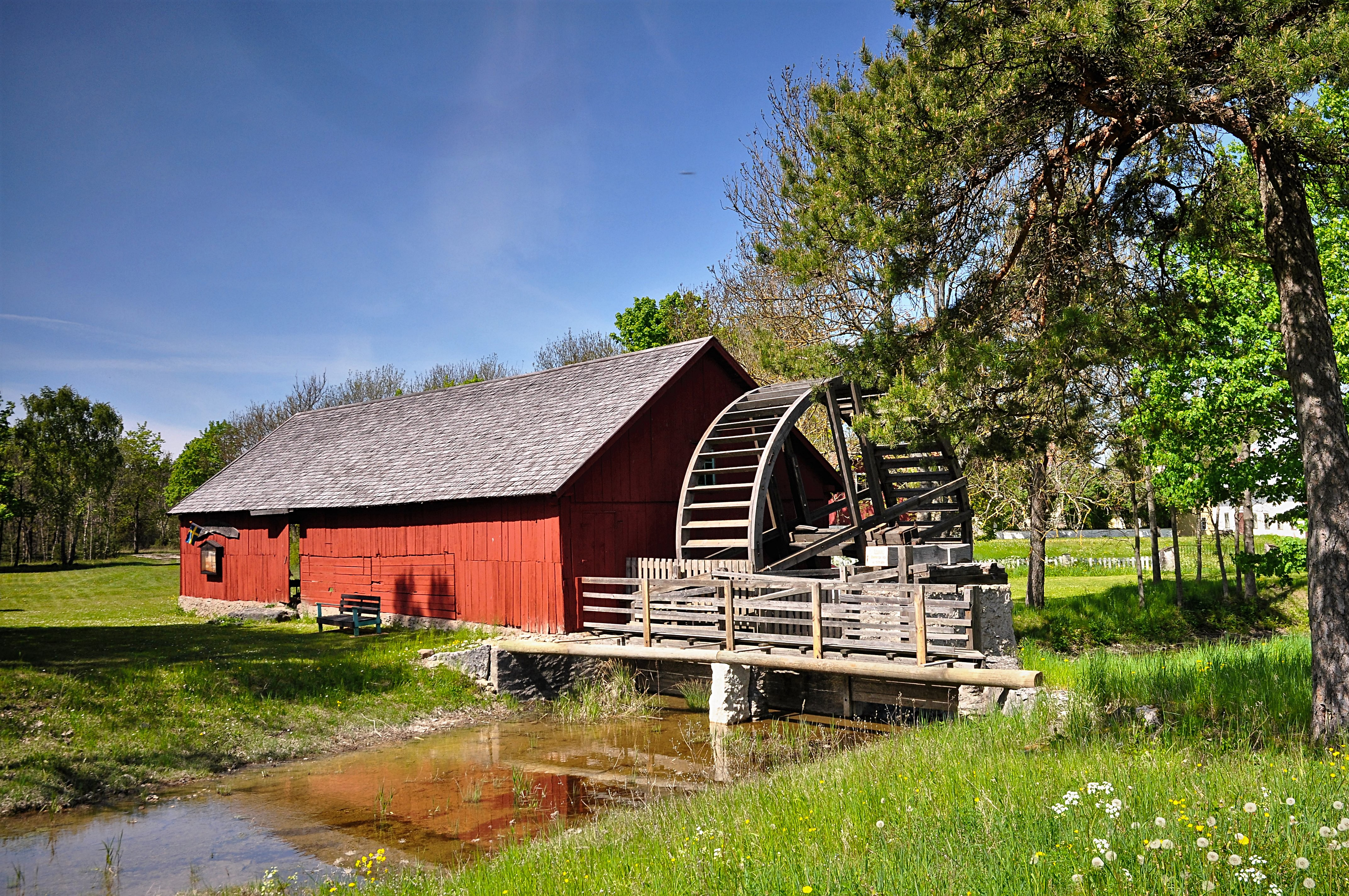
- Sigsarve saw mill in Hejde

- Location within Gotland
- Coordinates: 57°24′45″N 18°20′45″E
- Country: Sweden
- Province: Gotland
- County: Gotland County
- Municipality: Gotland Municipality

Area
  - Total: 62.64 km^{2} (24.19 sq mi)

Population (2014)
  - Total: 233
- Time zone: UTC+1 (CET)
  - Summer (DST): UTC+2 (CEST)

Hejde is a populated area, a socken (not to be confused with parish), on the Swedish island of Gotland. It comprises the same area as the administrative Hejde District, established on 1 January 2016.

== Geography ==
Hejde is situated in central Gotland. The medieval Hejde Church is located in the socken. As of 2019, Hejde Church belongs to Hejde parish in Klinte pastorat.
