= Hogrän =

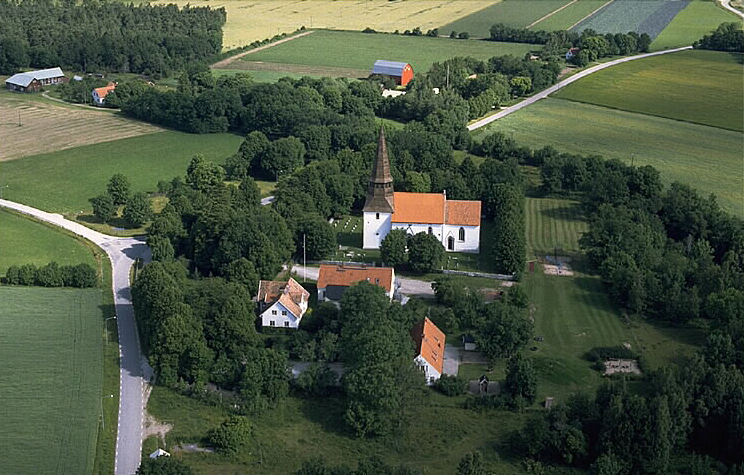
- Hogrän Church and the surrounding landscape in central Hogrän

- Location within Gotland
- Coordinates: 57°30′16″N 18°18′28″E
- Country: Sweden
- Province: Gotland
- County: Gotland County
- Municipality: Gotland Municipality

Area
  - Total: 22.18 km^{2} (8.56 sq mi)
- Time zone: UTC+1 (CET)
  - Summer (DST): UTC+2 (CEST)

Hogrän (Swedish pronunciation: [ˈhûːɡrɛːn]) is a populated area, a socken (not to be confused with parish), on the Swedish island of Gotland. It comprises the same area as the administrative Hogrän District, established on 1 January 2016.

== Geography ==
Hogrän is situated in the central inland of Gotland. The land is mainly flat farmlands mixed with meadows in the east part and forests and mires in the west. Most noted is Prostarve Änge where wild orchids grow.

The medieval Hogrän Church is located in the socken. As of 2019, Hogrän Church belongs to Vall-Hogrän-Atlingbo parish in Eskelhems pastorat, along with the churches in Vall and Atlingbo.

== History ==
A cache containing 23 sausage-shaped Viking Age bronze ingots were found in Hogrän. The find that also contained a penannular brooch and a pin. The find is called the Stora Enbjänne find, after the farm it was found on. In 1924, it was appropriated by Swedish History Museum in Stockholm where it is now kept. Several other finds have been made in the vicinity of Stora Enbjänne. Among these are a gold bracteate, a pot or silver coins, brooches, bracelets and weights. Traces and remnants from metal working have also been found.

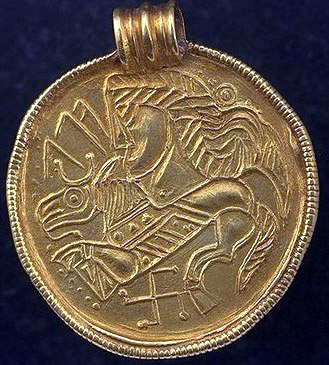
Gold bracteates found in Djupbrunns, Hogrän
