= Atlingbo =

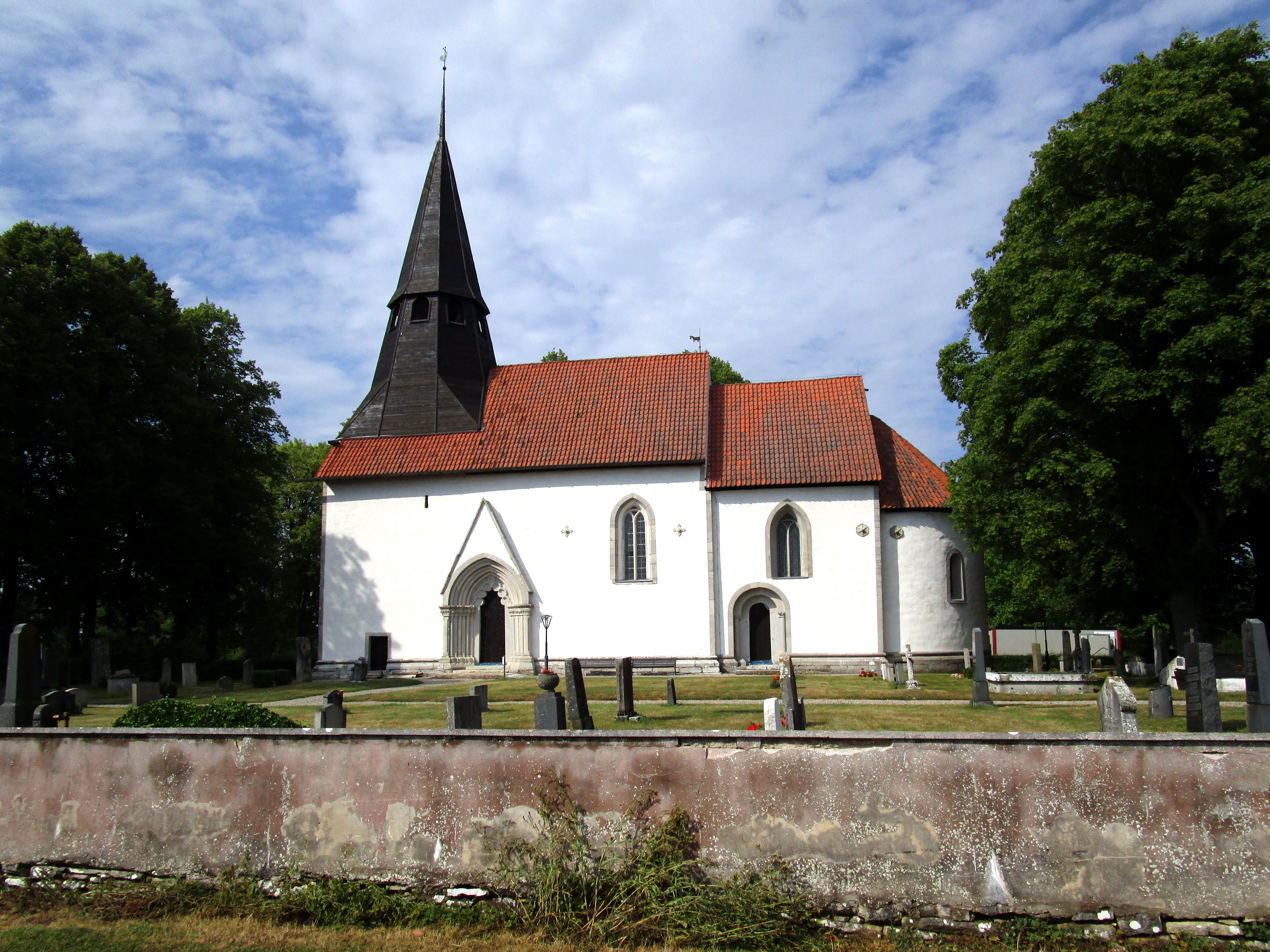
- Atlingbo Church

- Location within Gotland
- Coordinates: 57°28′47″N 18°23′26″E
- Country: Sweden
- Province: Gotland
- County: Gotland County
- Municipality: Gotland Municipality

Area
  - Total: 14.67 km^{2} (5.66 sq mi)

Population (2014)
  - Total: 128
- Time zone: UTC+1 (CET)
  - Summer (DST): UTC+2 (CEST)

Atlingbo is a populated area, a socken (not to be confused with parish), on the Swedish island of Gotland. It comprises the same area as the administrative Atlingbo District, established on 1 January 2016.

== Geography ==
Atlingbo is situated in the central part of Gotland. The medieval Atlingbo Church is located in the socken.

As of 2019, Atlingbo Church belongs to Vall-Hogrän-Atlingbo parish in Eskelhems pastorat, along with the churches in Vall and Hogrän.
