= Träkumla Church =

- Träkumla kyrka
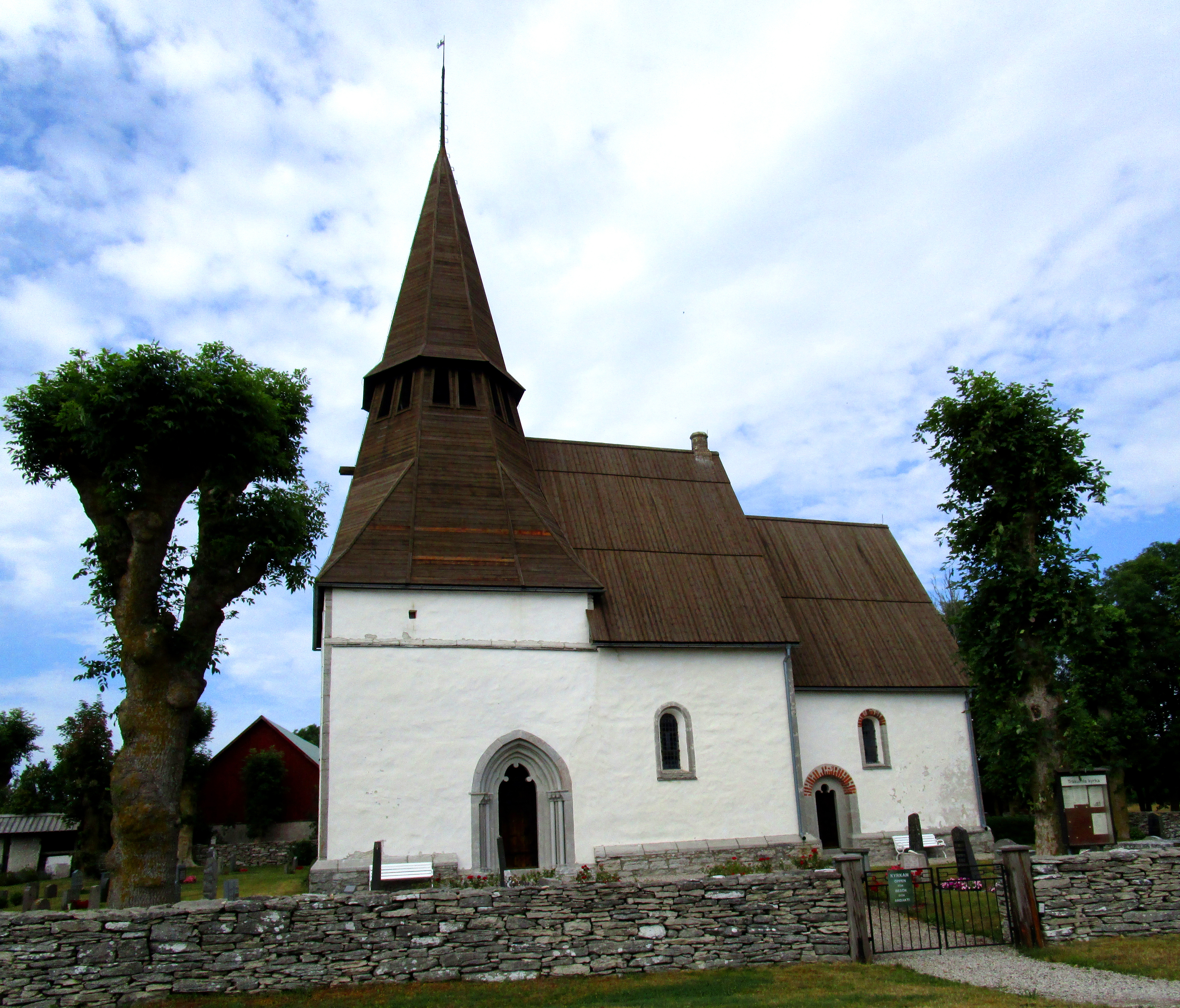
- Träkumla Church, view of the exterior

- Location on Gotland
- 57°33′37″N 18°18′47″E
- Country: Sweden
- Denomination: Church of Sweden

Administration
- Diocese: Visby

Träkumla Church (Swedish: Träkumla kyrka) is a medieval church on the Swedish island of Gotland, in the Baltic Sea. The church retains some murals and furnishings from the Middle Ages. It belongs to the Diocese of Visby.

== History and architecture ==
The presently visible, stone church was preceded by a wooden church on the same spot. The oldest part of the now visible church at Träkumla is the rectangular choir, which was built at the middle of the 13th century. The nave was added slightly later. The church was intended to have a tower; thick walls at the western end of the nave indicate that preparations were made for the erection of a tower, but it was never executed. The presently visible wooden spire dates instead from 1917. An inscription above the main portal, now lost, stated that the church was inaugurated on 1 September 1287. The church was abandoned in 1868 but restored in 1917. In 1951, it underwent another renovation.

Inside, the church is decorated with murals made by the Master of the Passion of Christ in the mid-15th century. They depict scenes from the legend about Saint Olaf. The church houses a number of medieval items. The baptismal font is from the 12th century and probably belonged to the first, wooden church. There is also a triumphal cross, a processional cross and a Madonna, all from the 15th century, as well as a few stained glass window panes dating from the 13th century. Furthermore, the wooden door is medieval. The altarpiece was assembled in the 17th century and is made of pieces from several earlier, medieval altarpieces.

The pulpit dates from the 17th century.
