= Hejde Church =

- Hejde kyrka
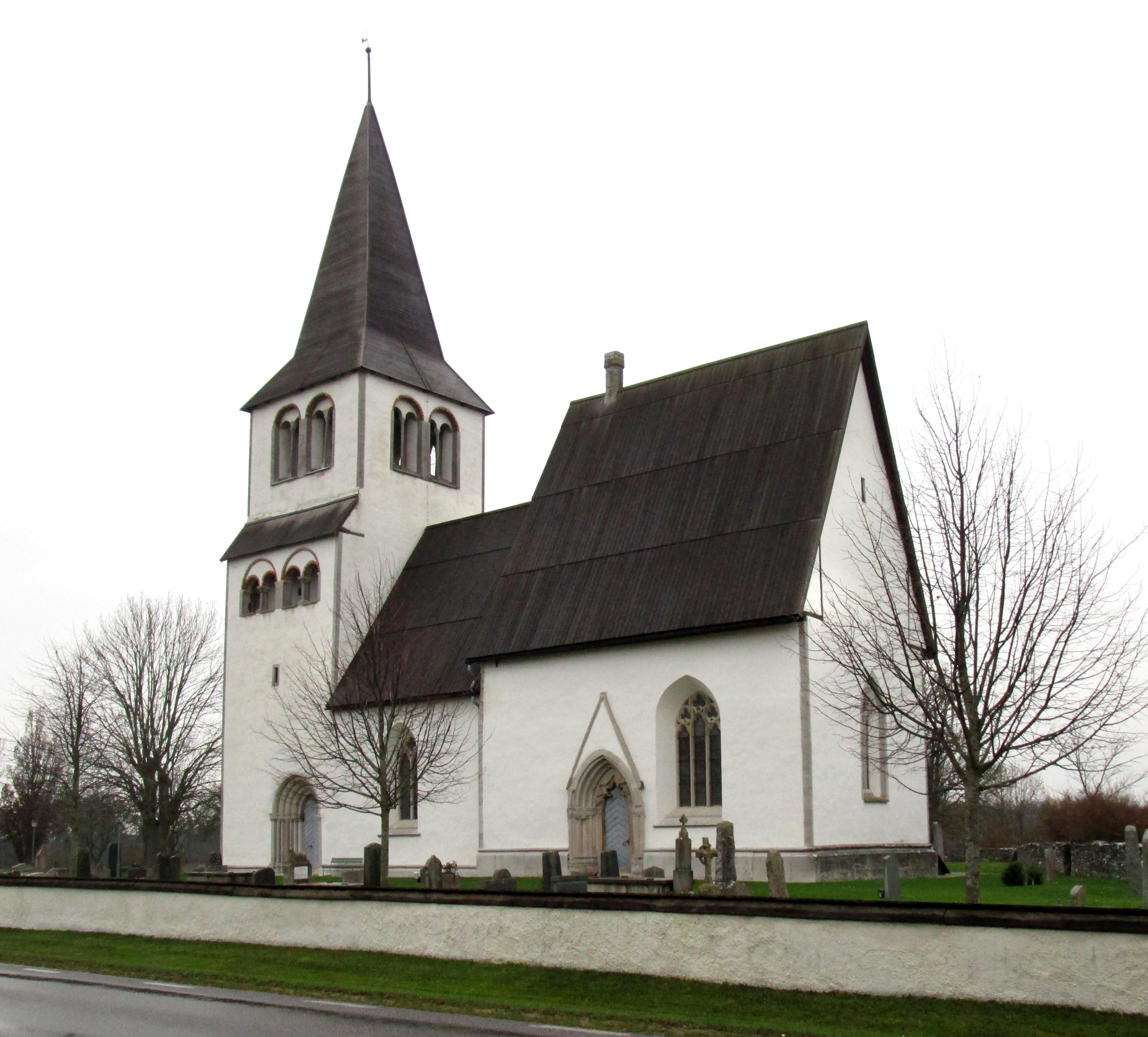
- Hejde Church, view of the exterior

- Location on Gotland
- 57°24′46″N 18°20′46″E
- Country: Sweden
- Denomination: Church of Sweden

Administration
- Diocese: Visby

Hejde Church (Swedish: Hejde kyrka) is a medieval Lutheran church in Hejde on the island of Gotland It lies the Diocese of Visby.

== History ==
The church tower and the nave are the oldest parts of Hejde Church, dating from the middle of the 13th century. The choir is about a century later and replaced an earlier and smaller Romanesque choir. Plans to also enlarge the nave and tower were never executed. The sacristy dates from 1795. Renovation have been carried out in 1935–36 under the direction of architect Erik Fant (1889–1954). Additional renovation was undertaken during 1976 and 1985–86.

The church is the property of the Church of Sweden and lies the Diocese of Visby.

== Architecture ==
The church has two decorated entrance portals on the south façade. Of these, the choir portal is considered one of the most peculiar on Gotland. The church tower is decorated with side galleries to the south and north, and has two openings for the church bells, each divided by colonnettes, on every side. The church roof is supported by rib vaults, which is unusual for churches on Gotland. The whitewashed church is covered by a pitched roof.

inside, murals from the 13th and 14th century decorate the walls. In the windows, medieval stained glass has been preserved (probably dating from the second half of the 14th century). The baptismal font is from the 12th century. The triumphal cross is dated to the 16th century.
