= Atlingbo Church =

- Atlingbo kyrka
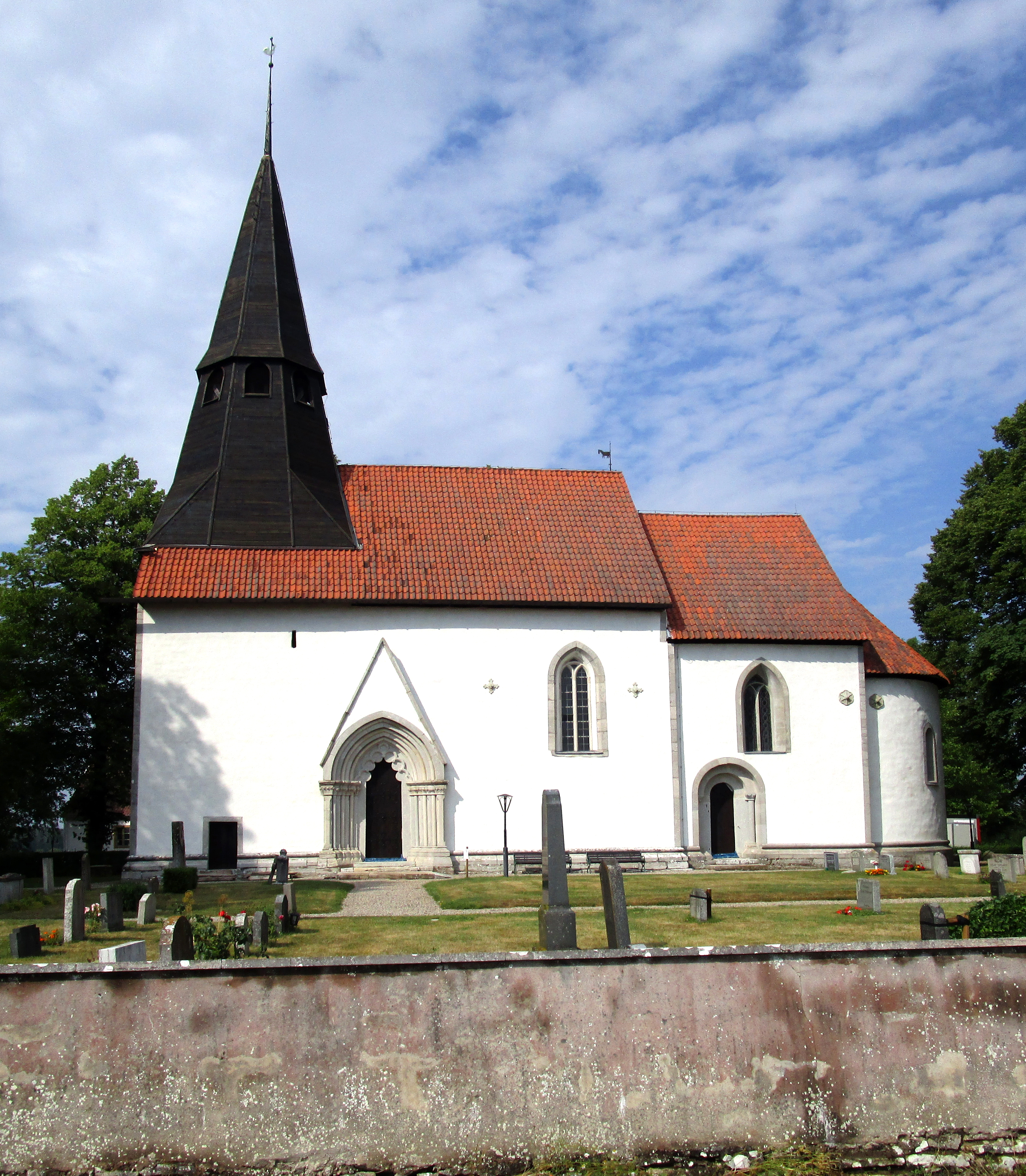
- Atlingbo Church, view of the exterior

- Location on Gotland
- 57°28′48″N 18°23′27″E
- Country: Sweden
- Denomination: Church of Sweden

Administration
- Diocese: Visby

Atlingbo Church (Swedish: Atlingbo kyrka) is a medieval church in Atlingbo on the Swedish island Gotland. Atlingbo Church was built in stages during the 13th century, with only the sacristy being of later date. The church contains a decorated Romanesque baptismal font made by the workshop or sculptor known as Byzantios. It is used by the Church of Sweden and lies in the Diocese of Visby.

== History and architecture ==
The present church was erected on the site of at least one earlier church; the first church on the site may have been one of the first churches on Gotland as it is mentioned in the Gutasaga. The presently visible church was erected during the 13th century. The oldest parts are the choir and apse, dating from the first part of the century. At the end of the century, the nave and tower base were constructed; the tower was never finished. The sacristy was added in 1800–01. The church has three remaining medieval portals, two Gothic and one Romanesque. In the nave there is unusually a hagioscope. Among the furnishings of the church, the octagonal baptismal font was made during the 12th century, probably by the Romanesque sculptor or workshop known as Byzantios. The altar and pulpit date from the 17th century while the pews are from the 18th century.

The church belongs to the Church of Sweden and lies within the Diocese of Visby.
