= Thomas Petersson (bishop) =

Swedish former prelate

The Right Reverend Thomas Petersson
- Bishop of Visby
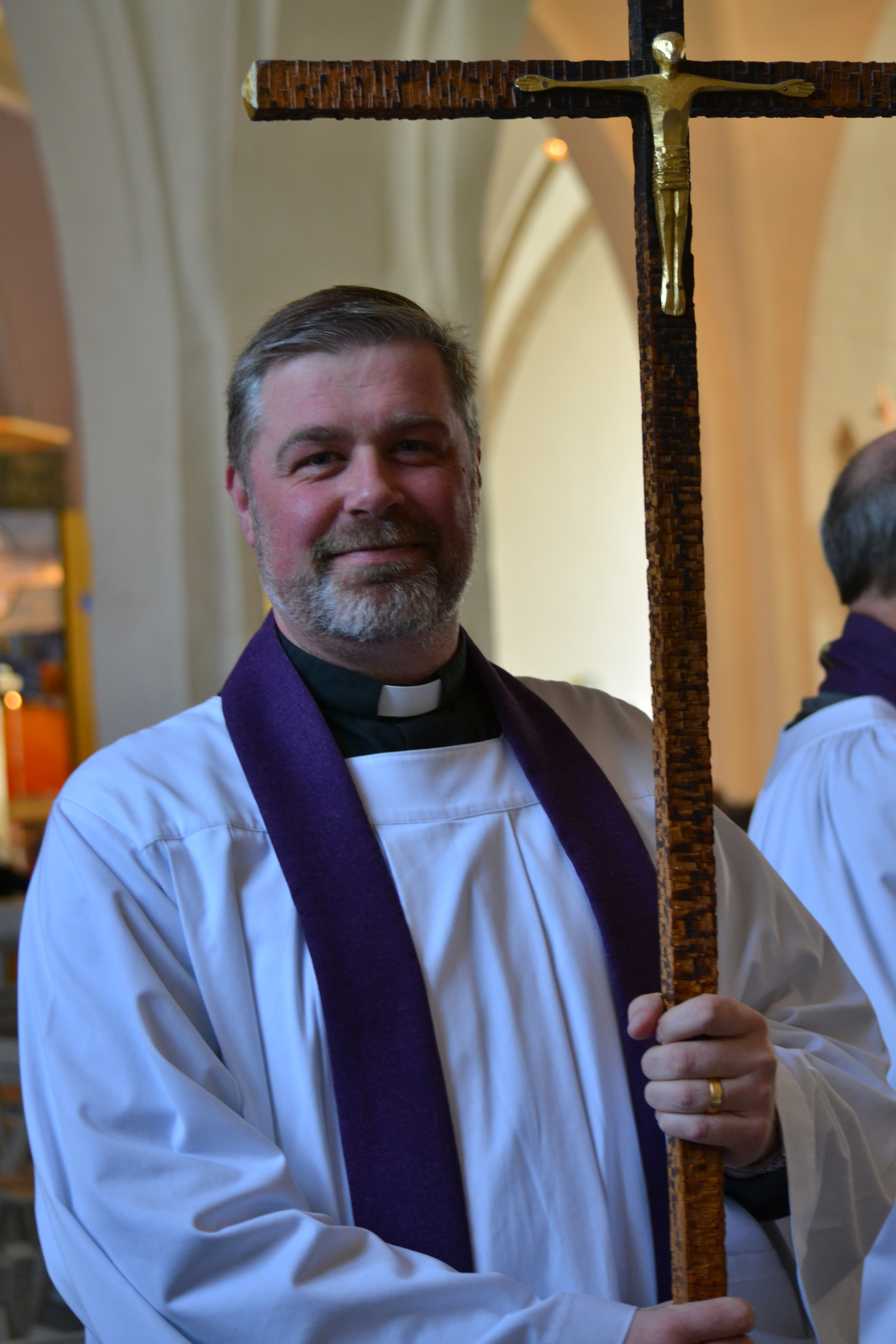
- Thomas Petersson (2013)
- Church: Church of Sweden
- Diocese: Visby
- Elected: 5 March 2018
- In office: 9 June 2018 – 1 February 2022
- Predecessor: Sven-Bernhard Fast
- Successor: Erik Eckerdal

Orders
- Ordination: 1992 by Martin Lönnebo
- Consecration: 3 June 2018 by Antje Jackelén
- Laicized: 1 February 2022

Personal details
- Born: April 8, 1968 (age 58) Motala, Sweden
- Motto: Du är seendets Gud (You are the Vision of God)

Thomas Ingemar Petersson (born 8 April 1968) is a Swedish prelate who is the former Bishop of Visby.

== Biography ==
Thomas Petersson was ordained priest in 1992 for the Diocese of Linköping. He worked as a pastor of St. Lawrence's Church, Söderköping between 1993–1995 and as a Stiftsadjunkt in the Diocese of Linköping between 1995 and 2002. He also served as pastor of the Ryds parish in Linköping from 2002 until 2006 and pastor of the Victoriaförsamlingen in Berlin between 2006–2011. In 2011 he was appointed as Dean of Växjö Cathedral and in 2014, in addition to being Dean, he became parish priest of the parish of Växjö, a parish consisting of 8 united churches. On March 5, 2018, he was elected bishop of Visby. He was consecrated bishop by Archbishop Antje Jackelén on June 3 the same year. He was installed as Bishop in Visby Cathedral on June 9.

== Removal as Bishop of Visby ==
On 1 February 2022, Petersson was laicized by the Church of Sweden's disciplinary committee and removed as Bishop of Visby for breach of conduct relating to an extra-marital affair with an employee within the diocese. It was the first time the church laicized and removed a bishop since Dick Helander in 1954.
