= Lennart Koskinen =

Former Bishop of Visby

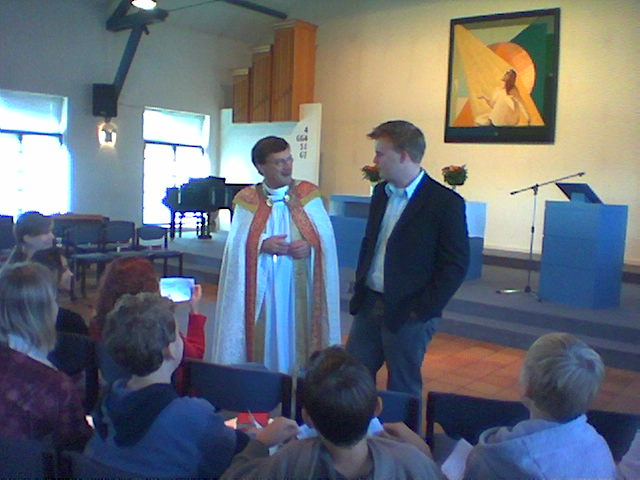

Lennart Koskinen (born November 12, 1944, in Helsinki), is a clergyman in the Church of Sweden. He was Bishop of Visby between 2003 and 2011.

Koskinen is a member of the Elijah Interfaith Institute Board of World Religious Leaders.
