= Diocese of Visby =

Diocese within the Church of Sweden

Diocese of Visby Diocesis Visbiensis Visby stift
- Arms of the diocese of Visby

- Flag

Location
- Country: Sweden
- Deaneries: 3 kontrakt
- Coordinates: 57°38′30″N 18°17′52″E

Statistics
- Parishes: 20
- Congregations: 42

Information
- Denomination: Church of Sweden
- Established: 1572
- Cathedral: Visby Cathedral

Current leadership
- Bishop: Erik Eckerdal
- Metropolitan Archbishop: Martin Modéus

Map

Website
- svenskakyrkan.se/visbystift

The Diocese of Visby (Swedish: Visby stift) is a division of the Church of Sweden consisting of the island of Gotland. Its seat is Visby Cathedral located in the largest town on Gotland, Visby.

The Bishop of Visby is also responsible for the episcopal oversight of the Church of Sweden Abroad (SKUT).

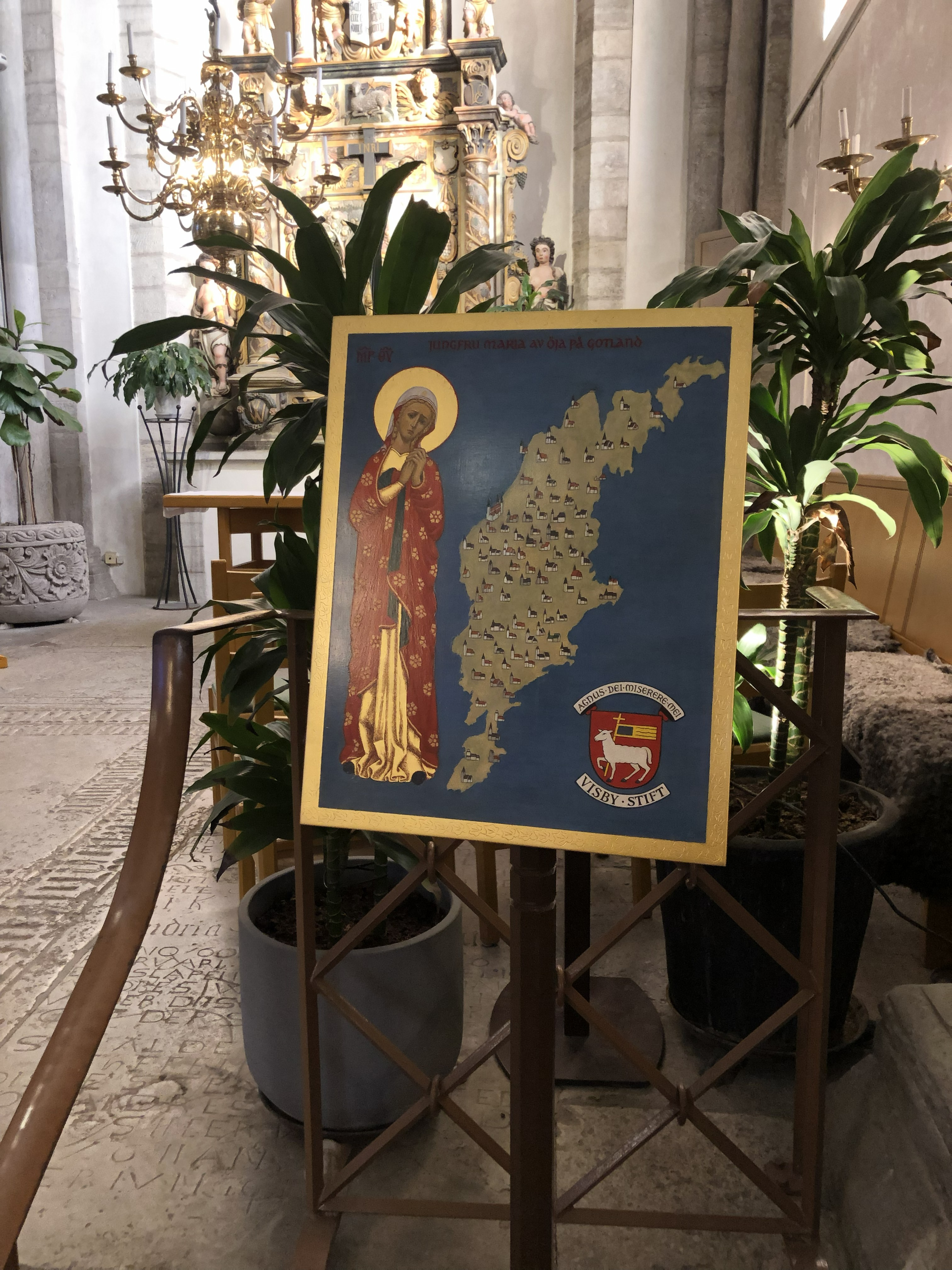
The icon portraying Our Lady of Öja, associated with the Diocese of Visby, on display a side chapel called the Pilgrim's chapel in the Cathedral.

== Bishops of Visby ==
- 1572–1589 Moritz Christensen Glad (Mauritius Christiani Lætus)
- 1586–1591 Petrus Johannis (Peder Hansen Riber)
- 1592–1596 David Hansson Bilefeld
- 1597–1599 Povel Andersen (Paulus Andræ Medelby)
- 1600–1601 Willatz Sörensson (Willadius Severini)
- 1601–1613 Lauritz Nielsøn Helsinburgicus
- 1615–1624 Antonius Johannis Kolding (Anton Hansen Kolding)
- 1627–1631 Theodorus Erasmi (Thor Rasmussen)
- 1631–1644 Oluff Fock (Olavus Phocas Staphrophski)
- 1645–1656 Hans Nilssøn Strelow
- 1656–1657 Niels Lauritzen Wallensis Gardeus
- 1657–1676 Johannes Brodinus
- 1676–1679 Hans Nilsson Endislöv
- 1679–1685 Haquin Spegel
- 1685–1692 Petrus Stjernman
- 1692–1709 Israel Kolmodin
- 1711–1734 Johan Esberg (Johannes Esbergius)
- 1735–1745 Georg Wallin d.y. (Jöran Wallin)
- 1745–1757 Martin Wilhelmsson Kammecker
- 1757–1795 Gabriel Thimotheus Thimotheusson Lütkeman
- 1795–1796 Karl Fredrik Muhrbeck
- 1796–1805 Johan Möller
- 1807–1813 Nils Gardell
- 1813–1838 Carl Johan Eberstein
- 1838–1841 Christopher Isac Heurlin
- 1841–1858 Carl Hallström
- 1859–1884 Lars Anton Anjou
- 1885–1920 Knut Henning Gezelius von Schéele
- 1920–1936 Viktor Rundgren
- 1936–1947 Torsten Ysander
- 1948–1950 Gunnar Hultgren
- 1951–1961 Algot Anderberg
- 1962–1980 Olof Herrlin
- 1980–1991 Tore Furberg
- 1991–2003 Biörn Fjärstedt
- 2003–2011 Lennart Koskinen
- 2011–2018 Sven-Bernhard Fast
- 2018–2022 Thomas Petersson
- 2023– Erik Eckerdal

== See also ==
- Churches on Gotland
- List of church ruins on Gotland
