= The Good Samaritan Window, Chartres Cathedral =

Stained-glass window in Chartres cathedral, France

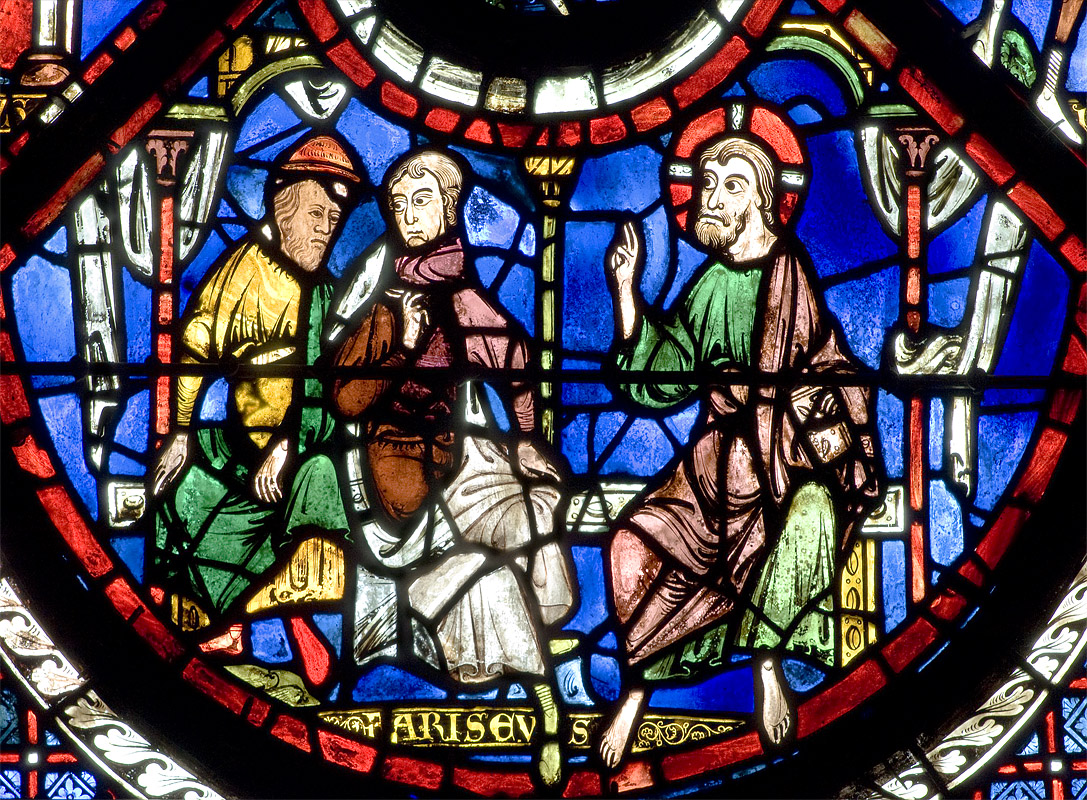
Title: PARISEUS. Here, Christ answers a pharisee's question "And who is my neighbor" by the Lukan parable of the Good Samaritan.

The Good Samaritan Window is located in the south aisle of the nave of the Cathedral Notre-Dame de Chartres in Chartres, France.

== Trade Windows ==
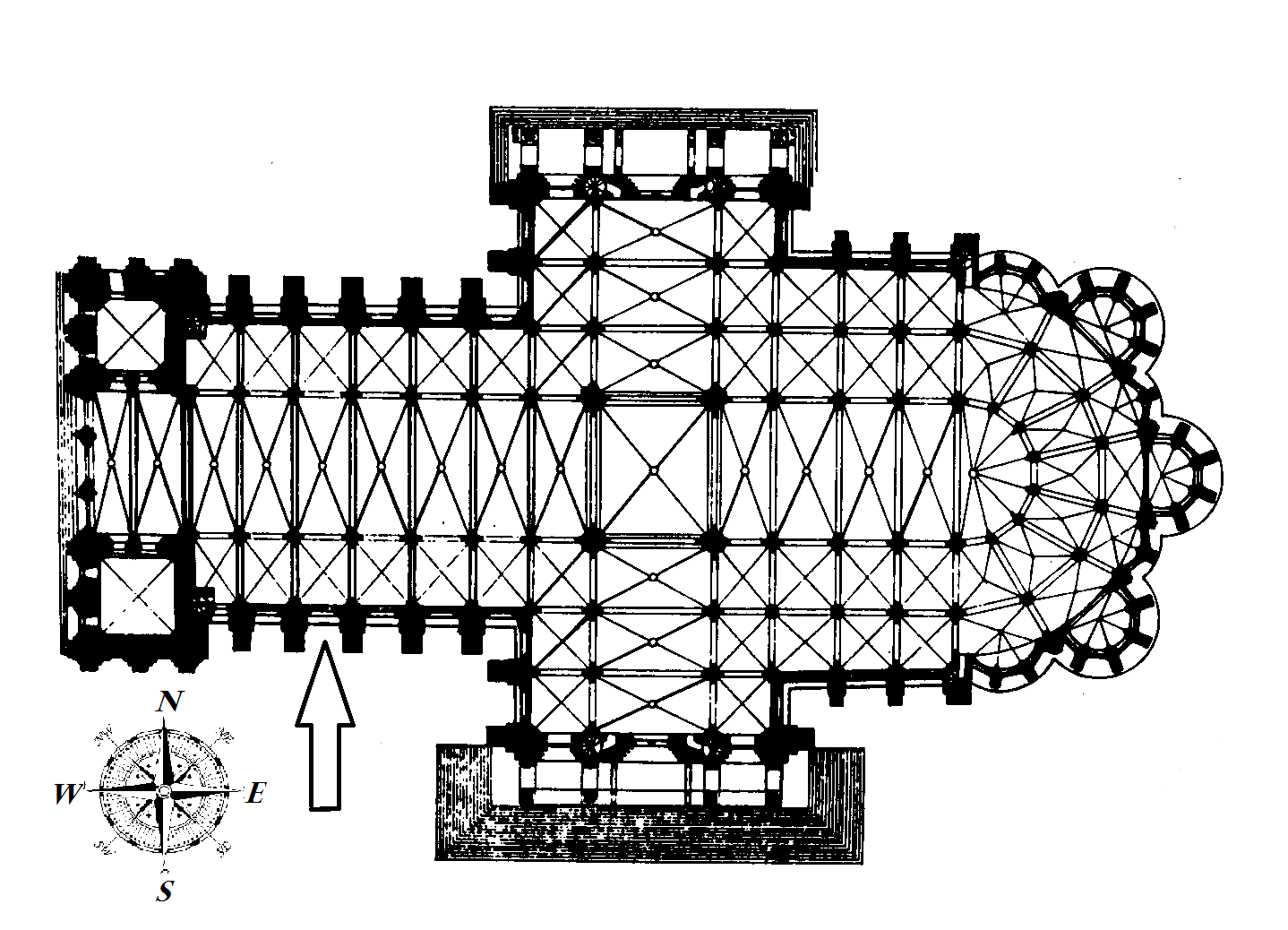
The Good Samaritan window is located on the south wall of the nave (Bay 44).

Trade windows first appeared at the cathedrals of Chartres and Bourges between 1200 and 1210. The 176 windows of Chartres present 125 depictions of tradesmen engaged in twenty-five different occupations making, transporting, and selling their products in forty-two windows. Anne Harris suggests that the trade windows at Chartres are an attempt to confront the increasingly pressing challenge which the town’s emerging urban economy presented to the church’s way of life and its understanding of the world.

== Good Samaritan Windows ==
The parable of the Good Samaritan (Luke 10:30-37) complemented by a series of Old and New Testament typologies served as a popular subject for cathedral glazing programs in the thirteenth century. Three French cathedral windows fabricated between 1200 and 1215 function in this way: Sens (c.1200), Chartres (1205/1215), and Bourges (c.1215). The Good Samaritan-Genesis typology is found as well in a window at Canterbury Cathedral.

Images of the Good Samaritan windows at Bourges, Chartres, and Sens are provided by The Corpus of Medieval Narrative Art, an archive of high-resolution photographs of medieval narrative art, concentrating on French 13th-century stained glass. They are copyrighted by Dr Stuart Whiting and available for legitimate academic purpose.

In one of the windows of the great Cathedral of Chartres, the story of the creation and fall of man is interwoven with the narrative of the Good Samaritan. This curious juxtaposition reflects and insight of the preachers and teachers of the early Church. The unfortunate man in Jesus’ parable who makes his way from Jerusalem to Jericho represents the human race which has fallen from the glory of the heavenly city to the degradation of the city of sin. Waylaid by robbers and left half-dead, he symbolizes all of humanity, robbed of its dignity and rendered incapable of saving itself. A priest and a Levite pass by but do nothing to help the wounded man. This vividly represents the incapacity of law and religious ritual in and of themselves to save us from sin. Finally, a hated Samaritan, a half-breed, stops and, moved with pity, pours wine and oil into the sufferer’s sores. He stands for Jesus, god and man, who applies the balm of the sacraments----the wine of the Eucharist and the oil of baptism, confirmation, and the anointing of the sick----to the wounds of the sin-sick soul. The Samaritan then brings the poor man to an inn and offers to pay for his treatment. The word “redemption” means, literally, to buy back, to pay for. Bearing the burden of our sins on the cross, Jesus paid our debt and bought us back. This parable of Jesus is so much more than a morality tale. It is a self-portrait of the Redeemer himself.----Father Robert Barron

== Chartres ==
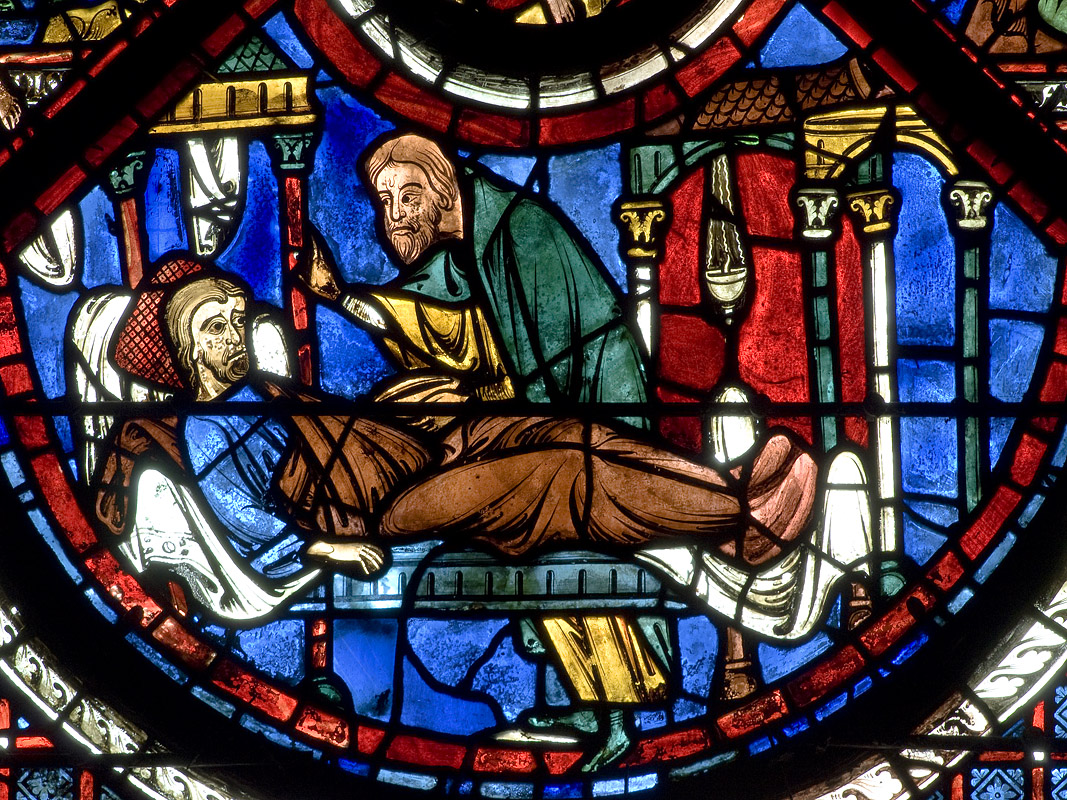
Panel 12 - At the inn, the Samaritan nurses the injured man back to health

The Good Samaritan window of the Cathedral Notre-Dame de Chartres is located in the south aisle of the nave (#44, see floorplan). Designed to be read from bottom to top, it presents twenty-four separate but interconnected panels. The window presents three medallion clusters (quatrefoils) supported by a demi-cluster horizontal base and interspersed with two lateral demi-medallion clusters.

- Panels 1-3 are "signature panels" featuring shoemakers.
- Panels 4-12 present the parable of the Good Samaritan.
- Panels 13-23 present material from the book of Genesis.
- Panel 24 presents Christ in Majesty.

=== Signature Panels: The Shoemakers ===
The demi-quatrefoil base comprises three signature panels (Panels 1-3) showing the donors of the window—the shoemakers. The cordonniers (shoemakers) had their shops on the rue de la Petite-Cordonnerie, a few steps from the south transept portals (The shoemakers also donated the Death of the Virgin window). Panels 1 and 2 picture them at work cutting leather and making cord soles.

Panel 3 presents a group of seven individuals presenting a stylized window; the panel is labeled "sutores o[btulerunt?]" (the shoemakers o[ffer?]"). The shoemakers are noted as having had a master in 1210; perhaps the leading figure, dressed in a green and red-brown, represents this master. Some of the figures watch the presentation of the window, others are looking up to Panel 4 where Jesus is delivering the Good Samaritan parable to two Pharisees. In the upper right hand of Panel 3 is the hand with pointing finger (the dextera domini) extruding from foliage(?) apparently blessing the work and the window of the shoemakers.

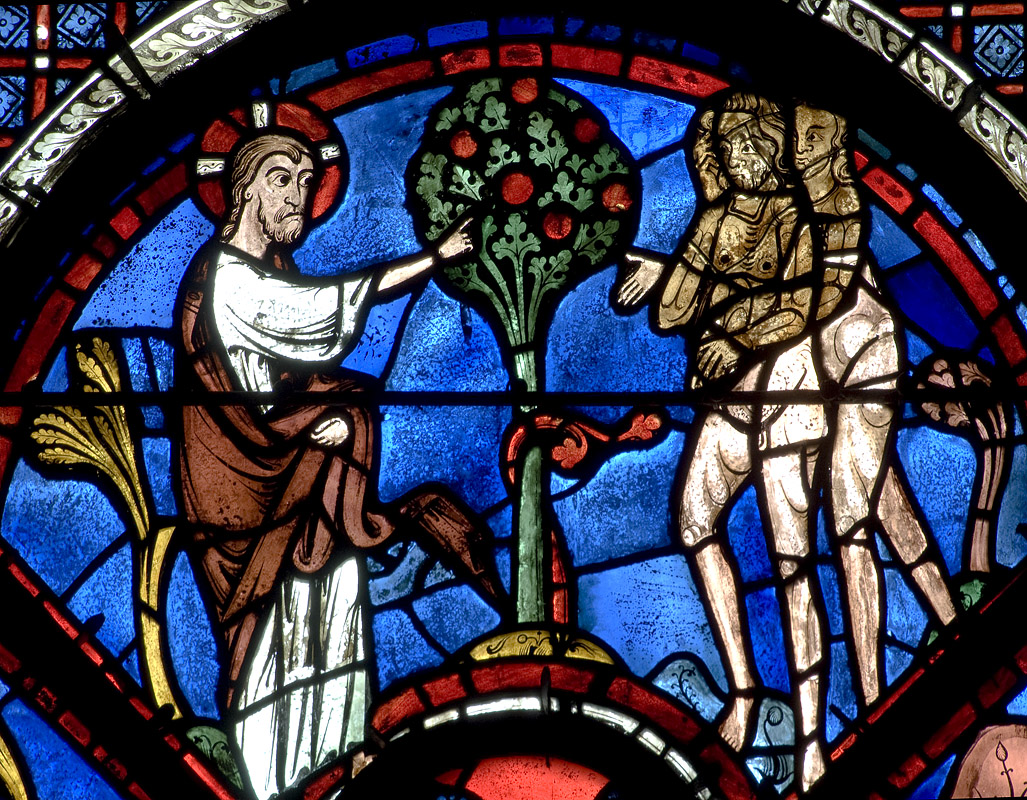
"Panel 16 - God warning Adam and Eve not to eat from the tree of knowledge"

=== Parable of the Good Samaritan (Luke 10:25-37) ===
Panels 5-12 present the parable of the Good Samaritan; they are preceded by Christ telling the parable to two Pharisees who had asked "Who is my neighbor?" One of the Pharisees wears the Judenhut or pilleus cornutus, a cone-shaped pointed hat worn by Jews in medieval Europe and some of the Islamic world. Jesus is seated with his right hand raised and his left hand holding a book, perhaps the book of the Gospels (Panel 4). The parable panels then follow: A traveler, described in the window as peregrinus or pilgrim leaves Jerusalem (see red coloring of gate interior (Panel 5), is stripped of clothing, beaten, and left half dead along the road by robbers. First a priest and then a Levite come by, but both avoid the man. Finally, a Samaritan comes to the traveler’s aid and provides for his care until he should return.

=== Genesis Materials (Genesis 2-4) ===
Stories from Genesis 2-4 are presented in the next eleven panels, beginning with Paradise and the creations of Adam and Eve, the temptation and Fall, and the fruits of the Fall (expulsion from Eden, hard labor, and murder) (Panels 13-23). Panel 14 (discussed below as well) is the central panel of the whole window: Adam, who is at the center of Creation, is placed at the center of the middle of the second medallion cluster. In Panel 21 we see Adam delving and Eve spinning. It has been suggested that Adam as sator (sower or planter) is a play on words for a shoemaker, sutor, and that Eve’s distaff echoes the shoemaker’s awl. Panel 23 concludes the Genesis narrative with the murder of Abel by his brother Cain and is perhaps an echo of the Good Samaritan robbers beating the pilgrim.

=== Christ In Majesty ===
The crowning panel presents Christ in majesty, seated upon a rainbow with one adoring angel on either side. The Lord holds in his hand what seems to be either an orb or a loaf of bread—this latter is not commonly part of the iconography of the Maiestas Domini (Panel 24). But if this round and brown object is bread its use in the image may signify that Christ himself is the "provision for the journey"—the viaticum. Panel 14, showing a prelapsarian Adam, echoes Panel 24: Adam is seated on a leaf or branch coming from one of the two trees; the curves of the trees suggest the mandorla typical of Maiestas Domini iconography. He stretches out his right hand in a gesture of authority and holds an orb in his left.

== Theme: Pilgrimage ==
Pilgrimage is clearly the dominating motif of the Good Samaritan window. Good shoes, such as those provided by the shoemakers of Chartres (Panels 1-3), and food for the journey (if indeed bread is what is shown in Panel 24) are basic necessities for the successful completion of a journey. The window then reproduces in visual form the allegorical interpretations of the parable of the Good Samaritan from such theologians as Irenaeus, Clement of Alexandria, Origen, Augustine, Gregory the Great, Bede, and others who saw the combined narratives as an allegory of humankind (the traveler), which, damaged at the fall and robbed of its divine likeness (just as the traveler was beaten and robbed), can receive no true salvation from the Old Law (the priest and Levite) but only from Christ (the Samaritan, who will return) and the Church (the inn, which provides aid until the Samaritan does return). The tropological conclusion of the combined narratives is recognition by the viewer of the need to strive for restoration of the likeness of God damaged in the Fall, a central means of which is the practice of charity.

The man leaving Jerusalem is Adam and is symbolic of fallen humanity leaving Paradise (note the common red door motif [in Panel 5 and in Panel 20]). The thieves who stripped and beat him represent the devil and other hostile powers who attack fallen humanity and leave them ‘half-dead’ with sin. The priest and Levite represent the old dispensation and its inability to provide salvation. The Samaritan is Jesus, who rescues fallen humanity from their sin, brings them to the ‘inn’ of the Church, and promises to return again." Panel 24, as mentioned above, shows us Christ in Majesty, who will return to judge the living and the dead; the bread the Christ holds in his hands may represent the Eucharist which Christ has given us as a pledge of future glory.

== The Good Samaritan Window ==
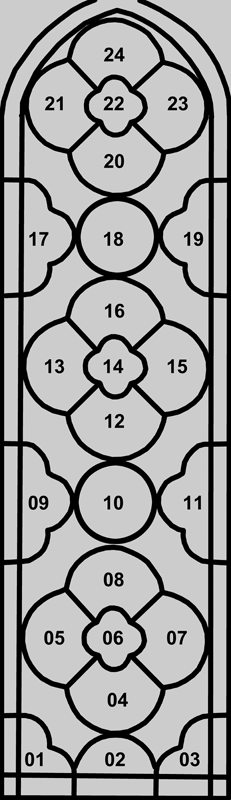
Map to Good Samaritan window image under "Narrative" section and key to "Trade Panels" section.

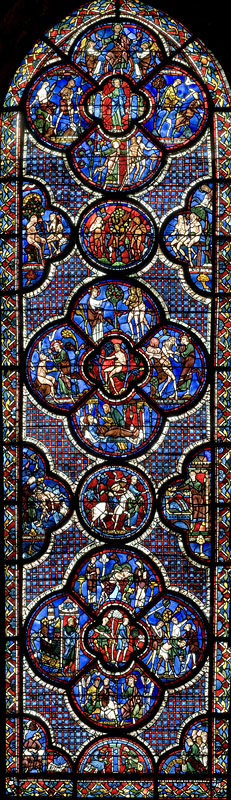
The full Good Samaritan and Creation Window, "donated by the Shoemakers' Guild." Three sections consist of the stories of the Good Samaritan of Jesus's Lukan parable as well as the creation and fall accounts of the biblical book of Genesis.

The Panels of Chartres Cathedral Windows, Creation and the Good Samaritan, contain 24 stained-glass windows. Plates one through three depict shoemakers, the funders of the window. Panels four through twelve from bottom to top depict the Story of the Good Samaritan, and the other panels - thirteen to twenty-four - depict the Story of Creation. These are the themes of the planes depicting the story of the Good Samaritan:

1 - Signature panel (a shoemaker cutting leather)

2 - Signature panel (shoemakers making cord soles)

3 - Signature panel (donation of the window)

4 - Christ telling the parable to a couple of Pharisees

5 - The pilgrim leaving Jerusalem

6 - A bandit prepares to attack the pilgrim

7 - The pilgrim is beaten, robbed and stripped

8 - A Priest and a Levite see the injured man but walk on past

9 - A Samaritan binds the injured man's wounds

10 - The Samaritan leading the Pilgrim to an inn (left panel of two)

11 - An innkeeper welcoming the Samaritan (right panel of pair)

12 - At the inn, the Samaritan nurses the injured man back to health

These are the themes of the planes depicting the story of Creation from the Book of Genesis: Chapter 2, vs. 7, 15-17, 20-22; Chapter 3, vs. 1-10, 16-18, 21-24; Chapter 4, vs. 1-8:

13 - God breathing life into Adam

14 - Adam dwelling in Paradise

15 - God creates Eve out of Adam's rib

16 - God warning Adam and Eve not to eat from the tree of knowledge

17 - Adam and Eve conversing beneath the tree of knowledge

18 - Tempted by the serpent, Eve tastes the forbidden fruit

19 - God finds Adam and Eve hiding their nakedness

20 - An angel casts Adam and Eve out of Paradise

21 - Labouring in the wilderness; Adam digs and Eve spins

22 - God instructing Adam and Eve how to live in the wilderness

23 - Cain murdering his brother Abel with a sickle

24 - Christ in Majesty, seated on the rainbow

== Christ in Majesty ==
Panel twenty-four, the image of Christ in Majesty, depicts Christ in glory.

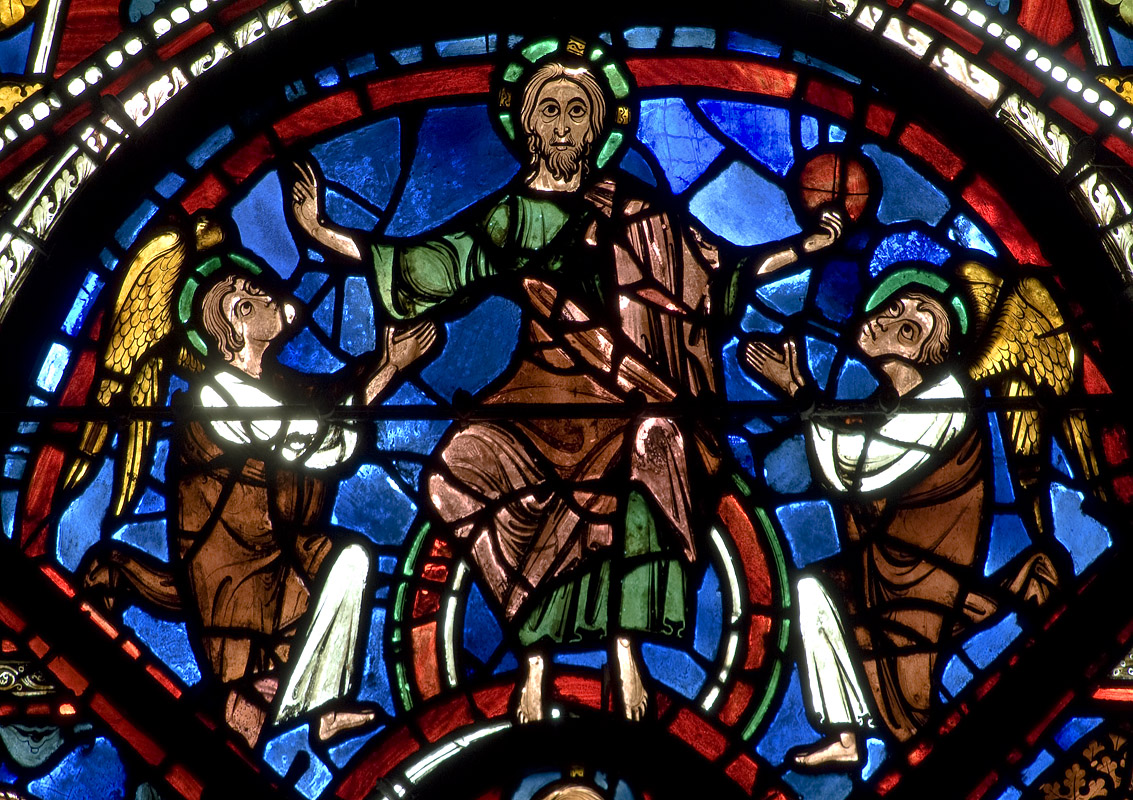
"Christ in Majesty, holding an orb and seated on the rainbow, flanked by adoring angels"
