= Östra Hoby Church =

Coordinates: 55°28′19″N 14°13′14″E

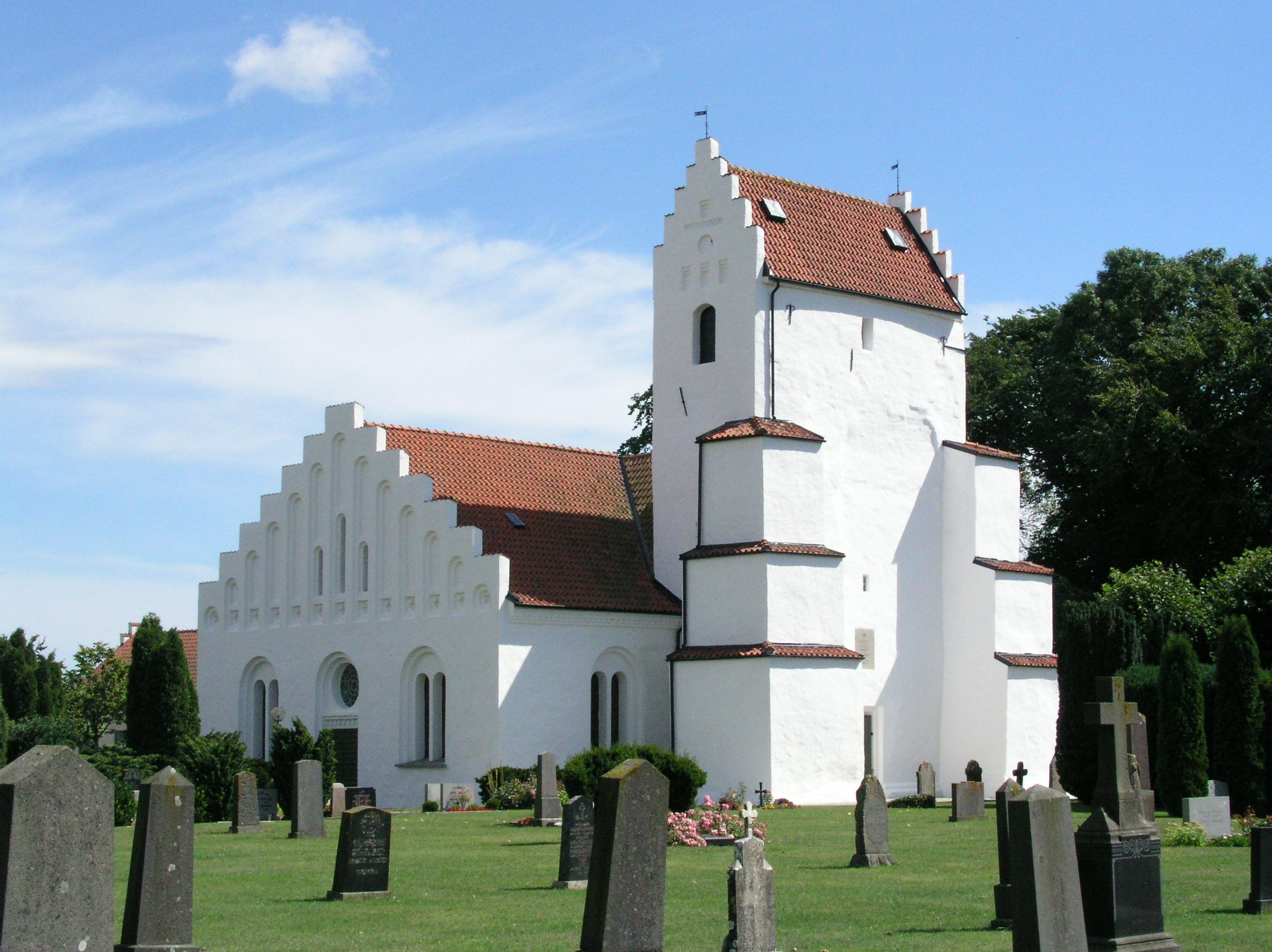
Östra Hoby Church

Östra Hoby Church (Swedish: Östra Hoby kyrka) is a medieval Lutheran church built in the Romanesque style. Located 4 km east of Borrby in Skåne County in southern Sweden, it belongs to the Diocese of Lund. The church is noted for its murals and for its sculpted baptismal font.

== History and architecture ==
Built of travertine, the apse and chancel are the earliest parts of the church, dating from the early 12th century. The nave was added in the second half of the 12th century, possibly in connection with an early tower. The two arms of the transept were added much later in 1850.

== Interior ==
The altarpiece (1654) has elements in both the Renaissance and Baroque styles. Its paintings depict scenes from the Old and New Testaments. The pulpit bears the date of 1651 but is probably older as it includes the arms of Queen Anne of Denmark who died in 1619. It is said the pulpit was intended for Trinity Church, Kristianstad but was brought here after the ship transporting it was stranded.

The font, sculpted with a figure of Christ enthroned, is the work of the 12th-century craftsman Majestatis, also known as the Tryde Master.

== Murals ==
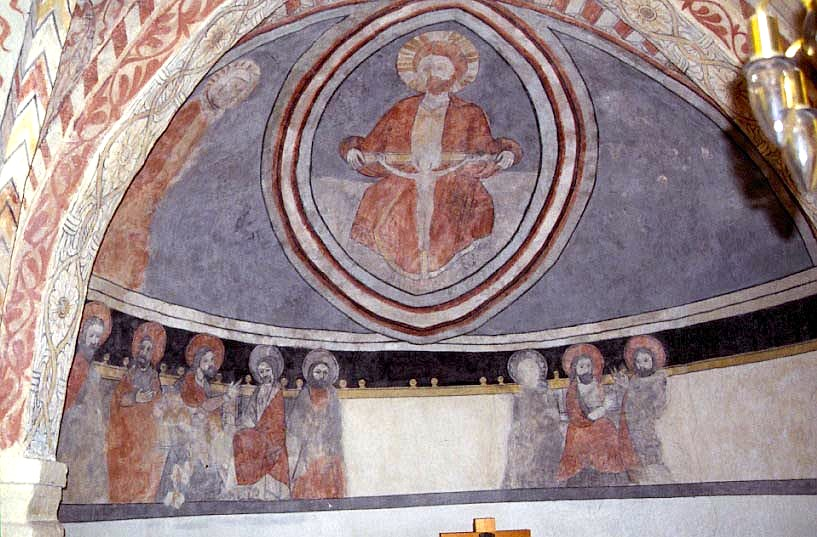
The Mercy Seat murals in the apse, altered from an earlier Majestas

The church has murals from various periods. In the apse and on the east wall of the nave there are fragments of late Romanesque decorations from the second half of the 13th century. Immediately after completion of the ceiling vaults in the 15th century, their ribs and arches were decorated with ornaments. Remains of these can be seen in various places. Around 1460, the arches were decorated with vines by the Fjälkinge Workshop which probably also altered a mural of the Majestas in the apse to one of the Mercy Seat. Traces of the original Majestas rainbow can still be seen. The murals in the apse and on the vaults were improved and extended from 1500 to 1515 by the Åle Workshop which worked around Aarhus in Denmark. The same workshop probably also painted the paintings in the vestibule under the tower.

The chancel vault contains paintings of the apostles by the Åle Workshop. The ribbons of text include remnants from the Creed and the names of the apostles. On the chancel wall there are images of Anne and Mary with Jesus on her lap. Among the murals on the vaulting at the point where the transept crosses the nave, there are fragments of the story of Adam and Eve. The serpent in one of the scenes is shaped like the figure of a woman bearing an apple for Adam and Eve.
