= Lokrume Church =

- Lokrume kyrka
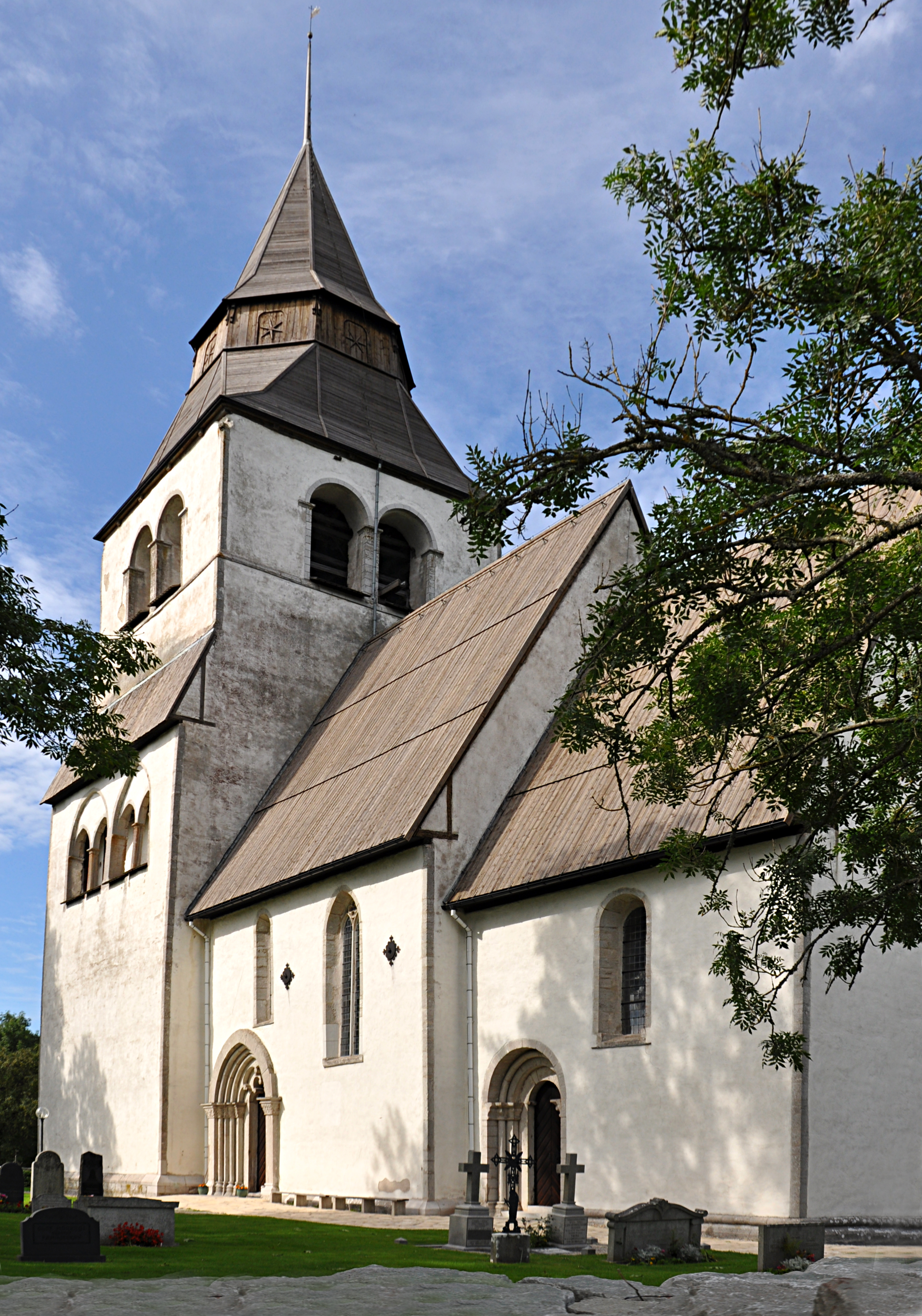
- Lokrume Church, view of the exterior

- Location on Gotland
- 57°41′16″N 18°32′20″E
- Country: Sweden
- Denomination: Church of Sweden

Administration
- Diocese: Visby

Lokrume Church (Swedish: Lokrume kyrka) is a medieval church on the Swedish island of Gotland. The oldest parts of the church are from the 12th century. It belongs to the Diocese of Visby.

== History and architecture ==
Lokrume Church has a history that goes back to at least the 12th century. The northern wall of the presently visible church nave dates from that century. Parts of the northern wall of the choir also date from this church. However, later reconstructions have reshaped the church and nothing more remains of this first, Romanesque church. During the second quarter of the 13th century, the larger part of the presently visible choir was built, with inspiration from churches in Visby. Slightly later is the rest of the nave and the sacristy. The last phase of the reconstruction was during the 1270s, when an earlier Romanesque tower was replaced with the presently visible one. The rebuilt church was inaugurated in 1277.

Inside, the church is sparsely decorated by murals from the 1270s. During a renovation in 1957-62, fragments of 15th-century murals were also discovered under layers of whitewash, but these were too damaged to be restored. The murals in the sacristy date from the 18th century. The altarpiece is from 1707, while the pulpit dates from the second half of the 17th century. The church furthermore has a triumphal cross from circa 1200, and a baptismal font by the artist known as Majestatis, dating from the later part of the 12th century. In the choir stands a choir bench made of parts dating from the 17th and 13th century respectively. Also in the choir is the tombstone of a judge name Gervid Lauks, dated 1380.
