= Majestatis =

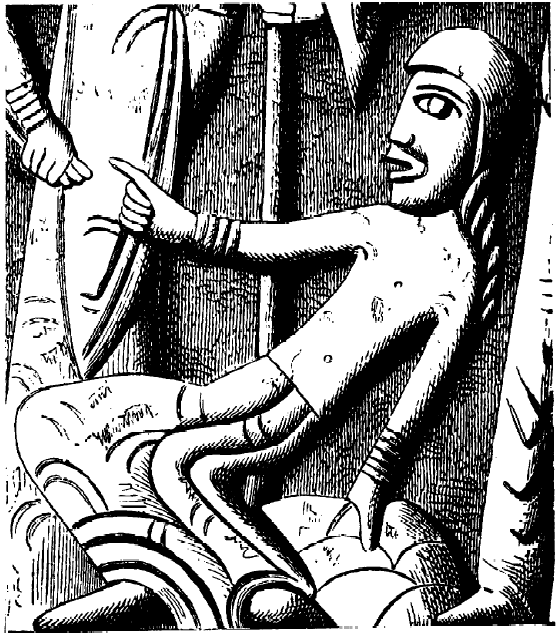
Illustration of detail on the Tryde baptismal font, by Majestatis

Majestatis (Latin: Magister Majestatis Domini, The Master of Christ in Majesty, usually shortened to Majestatis and sometimes referred to as the Tryde Master, fl. second half of the 12th century) was a Romanesque stone sculptor and the creator of several richly decorated baptismal fonts mainly in Scania and on Gotland (present-day Sweden).

== Life and works ==
The name Majestatis is a notname assigned to the artist or workshop; it is possible that an atelier rather than a single artist was responsible for the works attributed to Majestatis. Art historian Johnny Roosval coined the name in the 20th century. It derives from a subject often used by the artist, Christ in Majesty sitting on a rainbow and surrounded by a mandorla and angels. No written sources exist about the life or background of the artist, but it has been speculated that Majestatis was trained in Burgundy or Alsace or may have come from there. Majestatis initially seems to have worked in Scania, probably for the local nobility and possibly the (at the time Danish) royal family. Majestatis appears to have worked at the construction site of Lund Cathedral. Later Majestatis seems to have moved to Gotland.

The chef d'oeuvre of Majestatis is the baptismal font of the church of Tryde, Scania, Sweden. The sculptures probably depict, apart from a scene with Christ in Majesty, the legend of St. Stanislaus. It is probable that the motive has some connection to, and the font may even have been commissioned by, the then reigning queen of Denmark (as Scania was then a part of Denmark), queen Sophia, spouse of Valdemar I of Denmark. Sophia had Polish ancestors and not least for that reason the creation of the font has been connected with the royal family. Another theory is that the carvings on the font depict the legend of Saint Fridolin. The font from Tryde was displayed at the International Exposition of 1867 in Paris, and awarded a bronze medal.

Majestatis made an additional four or possibly five baptismal fonts for churches in Scania; these were probably all made for local noblemen as they display a high degree of refinement. This group of fonts include the fonts in Löderup, Östra Hoby, Valleberga and Simris churches, and possibly Östra Nöbbelöv. They are all located in the south-eastern part of the province.

The baptismal fonts and other stone sculpture identified to be by Majestatis on Gotland island are of a later date than those in Scania. Perhaps the best of the sculptor's works on Gotland is the northern portal of Hablingbo Church. Other works include baptismal fonts in Lokrume, Vall, Sproge, Stenkyrka, Väskinde and Gerum churches, as well as a few others, for example in Denmark and Hälsingland, Sweden.

Stylistically, Majestatis is recognisable through his elongated figures with well-kept, often braided hair, pear-shaped faces and large, rather pointed, oval eyes. The sculptor is known for the profusely adorned, but not overdecorated, baptismal fonts.

== Gallery ==
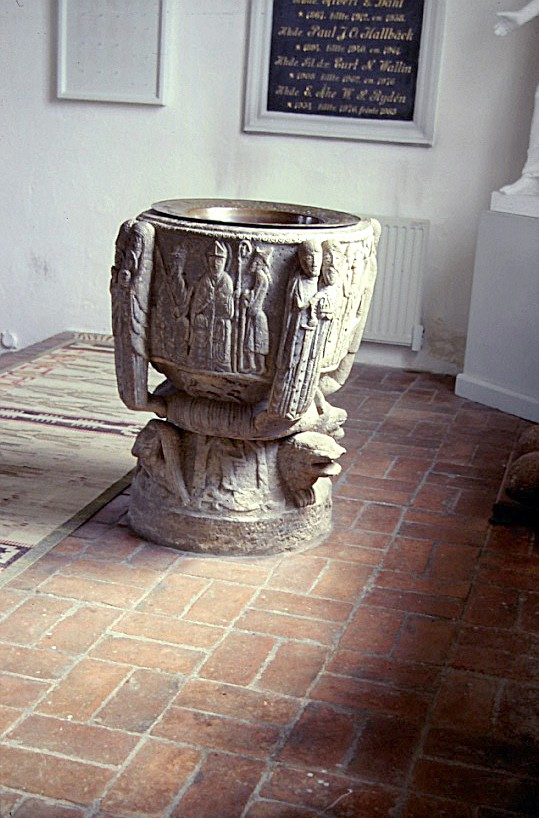
Font in Tryde Church, Scania

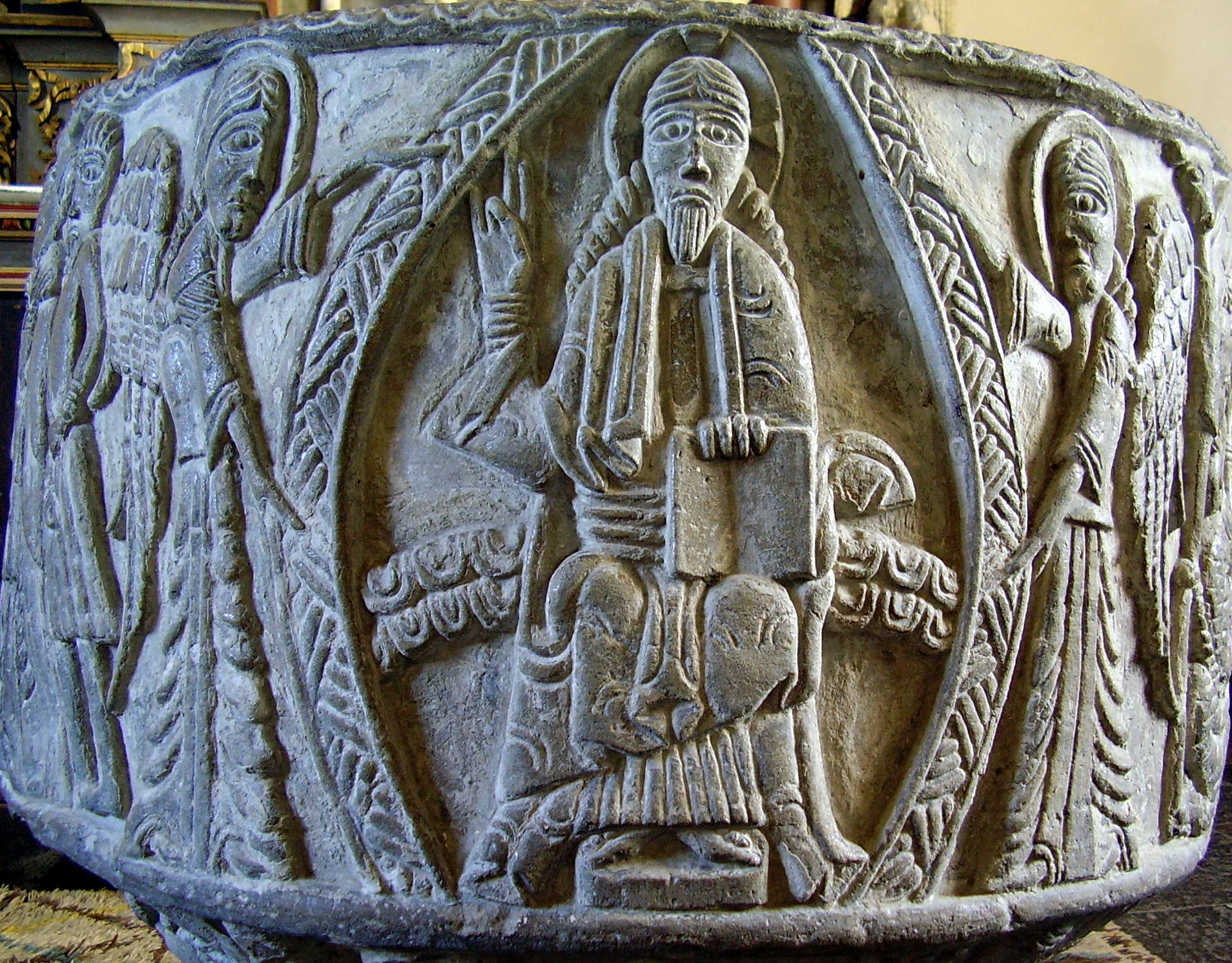
Font in Löderup Church, Scania

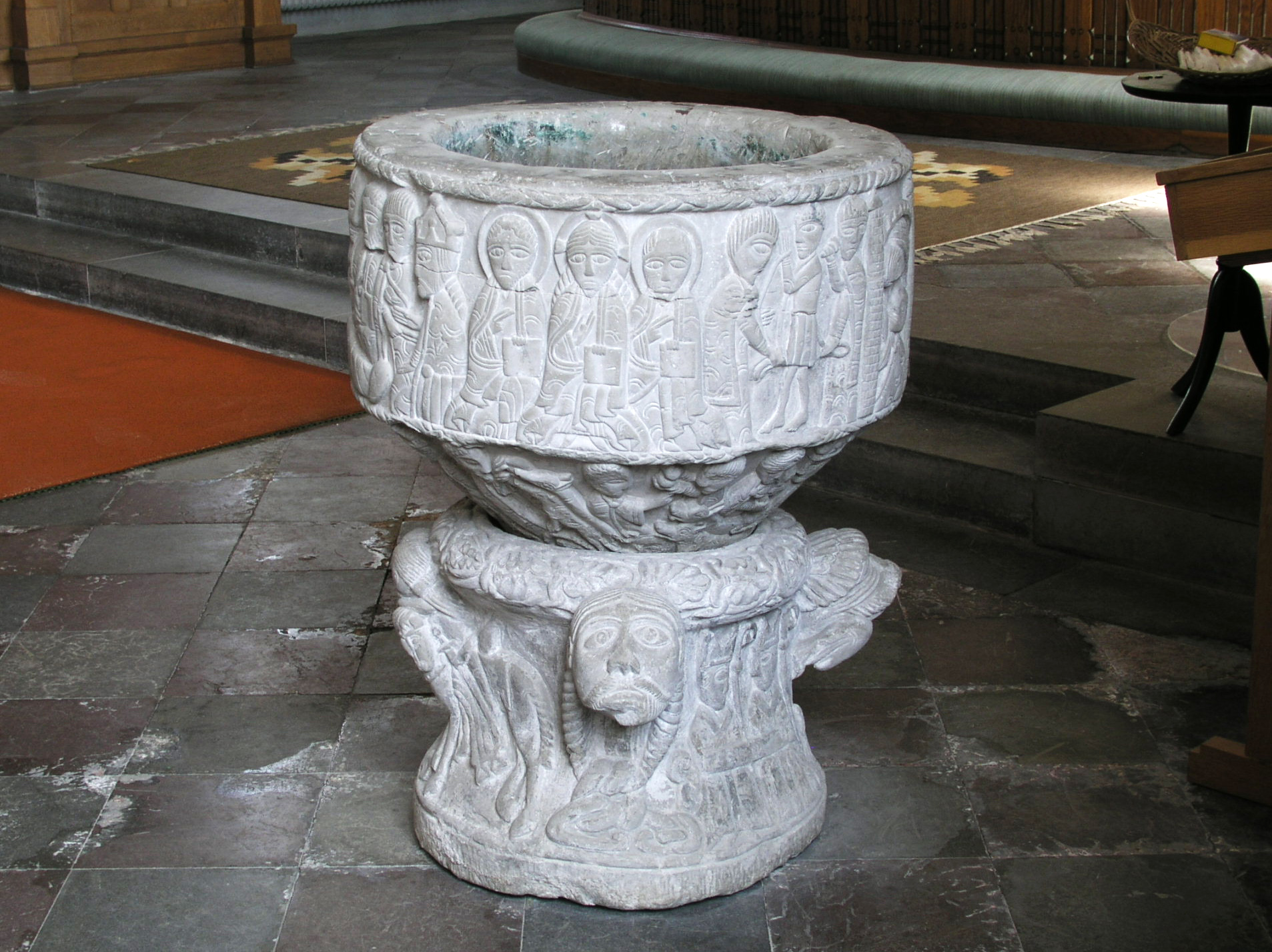
Font in Valleberga Church, Scania

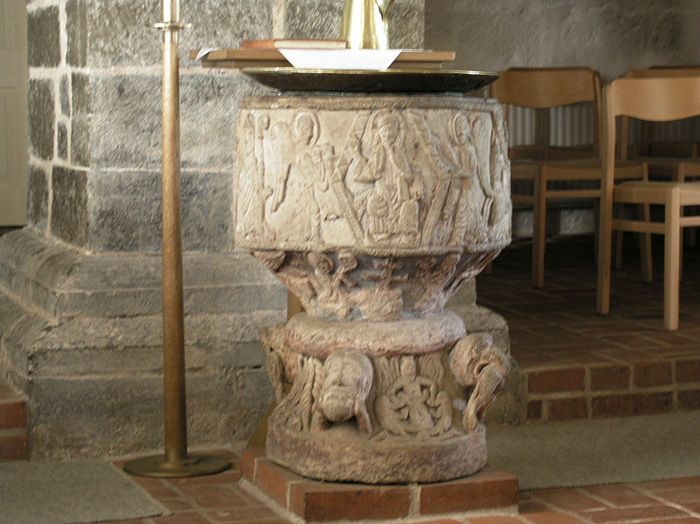
Font in Östra Hoby Church, Scania

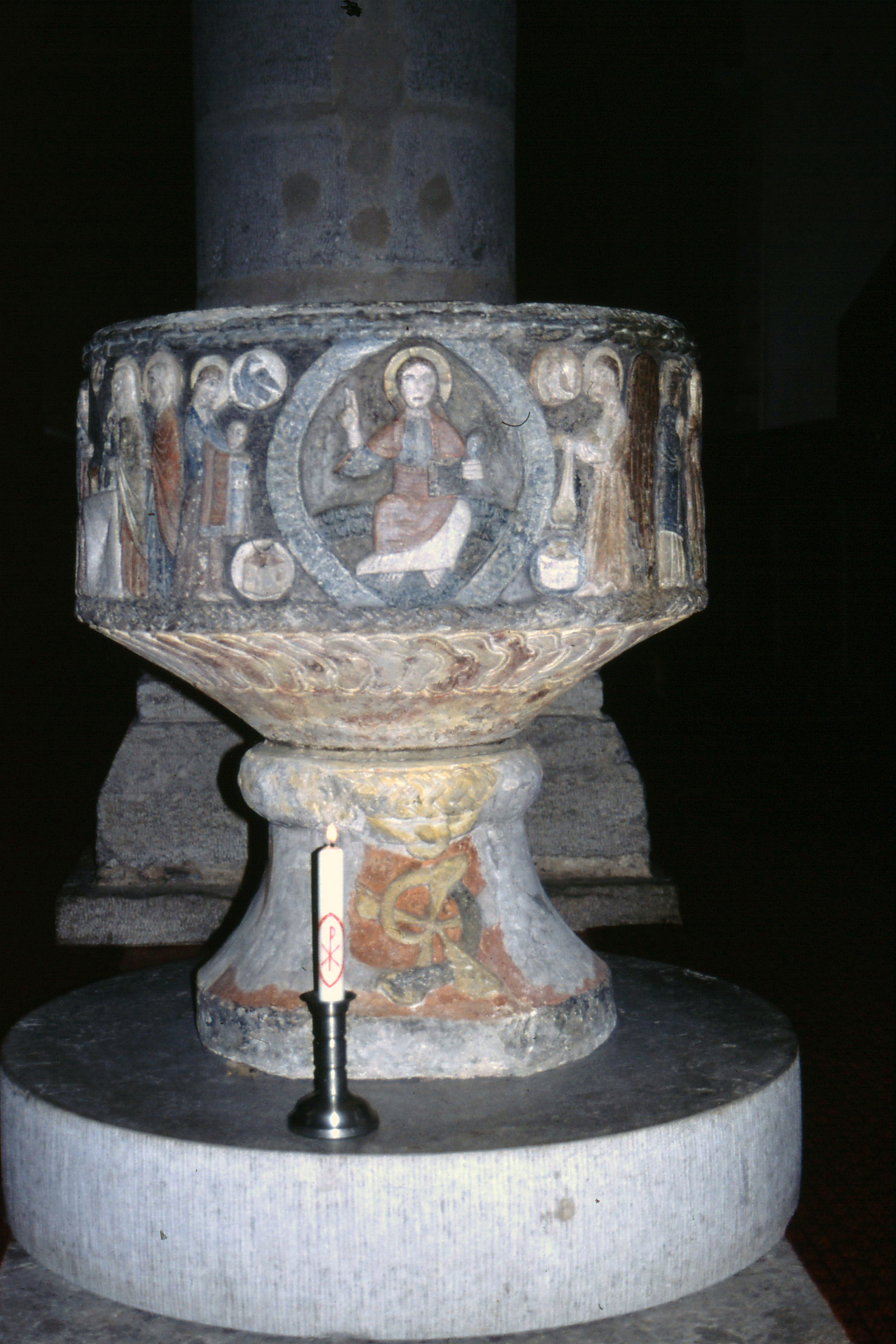
Font in Vall Church, Gotland

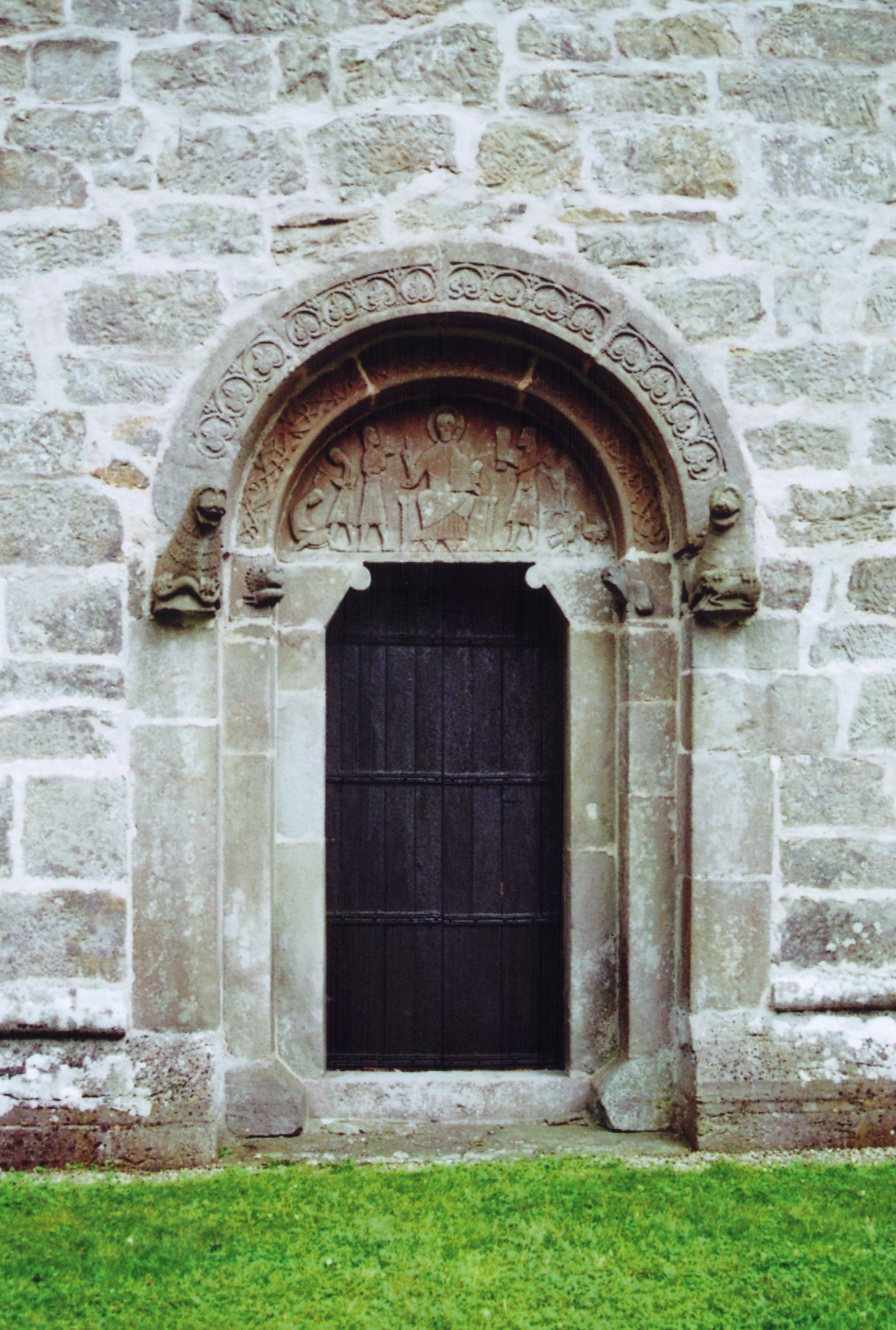
North portal of Hablingbo Church, Gotland

== See also ==
- Byzantios
- Calcarius
- Hegvald
- Sigraf
