= Pneumocystosis =

Fungal infection of the lungs

- Other names: Pneumocystis jiroveci pneumonia, Pneumocystis pneumonia, PCP, Pneumocystis carinii pneumonia
- Pneumocystis jirovecii cysts
- Specialty: Infectious diseases
- Symptoms: Lungs: Cough, difficulty breathing, fever.; Disseminated: Depends on affected organ; Skin: Lump or fluid in ear
- Complications: Lungs: respiratory failure; Skin: Perforated ear drum
- Types: Pneumocystis pneumonia (lung), Disseminated: lymph nodes, spleen, liver, bone marrow; Skin
- Causes: Pneumocystis jirovecii
- Risk factors: Poor immunity, HIV/AIDS
- Diagnostic method: Medical imaging, bronchoalveolar lavage, immunofluorescence assay, biopsy
- Prevention: Trimethoprim/sulfamethoxazole (co-trimoxazole) in high risk groups
- Medication: Trimethoprim/sulfamethoxazole (co-trimoxazole)
- Frequency: Uncommon, 97% in lungs

Pneumocystosis is a fungal infection that most often presents as Pneumocystis pneumonia in people with HIV/AIDS or poor immunity. It usually causes cough, difficulty breathing and fever, and can lead to respiratory failure. Involvement outside the lungs is rare but, can occur as a disseminated type affecting lymph nodes, spleen, liver, bone marrow, eyes, kidneys, thyroid, gastrointestinal tract or other organs. If occurring in the skin, it usually presents as nodular growths in the ear canals or underarms.

It is caused by Pneumocystis jirovecii, a fungus which is usually breathed in and found in the lungs of healthy people without causing disease, until the person's immune system becomes weakened.

Diagnosis is by identifying the organism from a sample of fluid from affected lungs or a biopsy. Prevention in high risk people, and treatment in those affected is usually with trimethoprim/sulfamethoxazole (co-trimoxazole).

The prevalence is unknown. Less than 3% of cases do not involve the lungs. The first cases of pneumocystosis affecting lungs were described in premature infants in Europe following the Second World War.

== Signs and symptoms ==
Pneumocystosis is generally an infection in the lungs. Involvement outside the lungs is rare but, can occur as a disseminated type affecting lymph nodes, bone marrow, liver or spleen. It may also affect skin, eyes, kidneys, thyroid, heart, adrenals and gastrointestinal tract.

=== Lungs ===
When the lungs are affected there is usually a dry cough, difficulty breathing and fever, usually present for longer than four weeks. There may be chest pain, shivering or tiredness. The oxygen saturation is low. The lungs may fail to function.

=== Eyes ===
Pneumocystosis in eyes may appear as a single or multiple (up to 50) yellow-white plaques in the eye's choroid layer or just beneath the retina. Vision is usually not affected and it is typically found by chance.

=== Skin ===
If occurring in the skin, pneumocystosis most often presents as nodular growths in the ear canals of a person with HIV/AIDS. There may be fluid in the ear. Skin involvement may appear outside the ear, usually palms, soles or underarms; as a rash, or small bumps with a dip. It can occur on the face as brownish bumps and plaques. The bumps may be tender and the ulcerate. Infection in the ear may result in a perforated ear drum or destruction of the mastoid bone. The nerves in the head may be affected.

== Cause ==
Pneumocystosis is caused by Pneumocystis jirovecii, a fungus which is generally found in the lungs of healthy people, without causing disease until the person's immune system becomes weakened.

== Risk factors ==
Pneumocystosis occurs predominantly in people with HIV/AIDS. Other risk factors include chronic lung disease, cancer, autoimmune diseases, organ transplant, or taking corticosteroids.

== Diagnosis ==
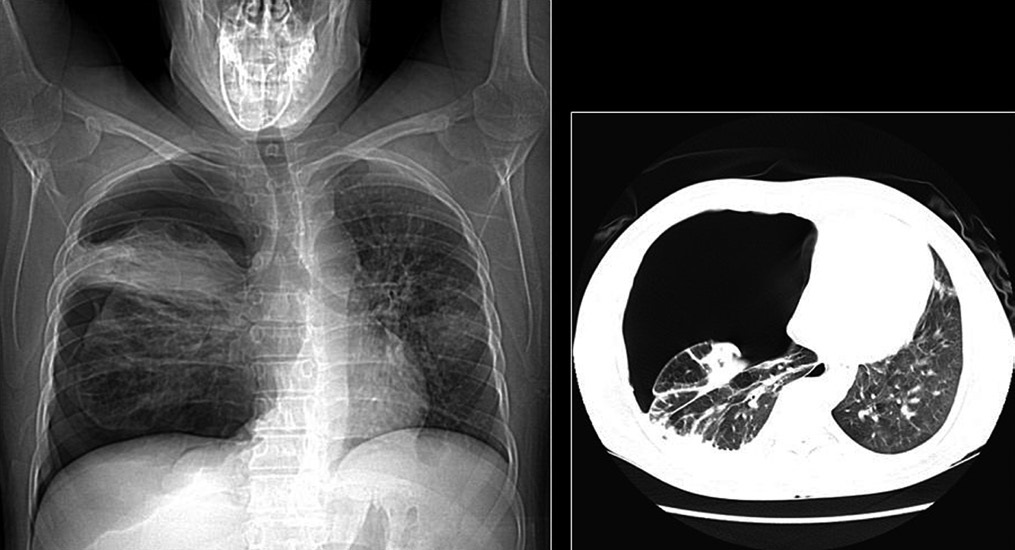
X-ray and CT of ground glass opacities and pneumothorax in pneumocystis pneumonia

Diagnosis of Pneumocystis pneumonia is by identifying the organism from a sample of sputum, fluid from affected lungs or a biopsy. A chest X-ray of affected lungs show widespread shadowing in both lungs, with a "bat-wing" pattern and ground glass appearance. Giemsa or silver stains can be used to identify the organism, as well as direct immunofluorescence of infected cells. The GMS stain has high sensitivity and specificity for Pneumocystis from lung tissue specimens.

Diagnosis in the eye involves fundoscopy. A biopsy of the retina and choroid layer may be performed. In affected liver, biopsy shows focal areas of necrosis and sinusoidal widening. H&E staining show extracellular frothy pink material. Typical cysts with a solid dark dot can be seen using a Grocott silver stain.

=== Differential diagnosis ===
Pneumocystosis may appear similar to pulmonary embolism or adult respiratory distress syndrome. Other infections can present similarly such as tuberculosis, Legionella, and severe flu.

== Prevention ==
There is no vaccine that prevents pneumocystosis. Trimethoprim/sulfamethoxazole (co-trimoxazole) prophylaxis might be prescribed for people at high risk.

== Treatment ==
Treatment is usually with co-trimoxazole. Other options include pentamidine, dapsone and atovaquone.

== Outcomes ==
It is fatal in 10-20% of people with HIV/AIDS. Pneumocystosis in people without HIV/AIDS is frequently diagnosed late and the death rate is therefore higher; 30-60%.

== Epidemiology ==
The exact number of people in the world affected is not known. Pneumocystosis affects lungs in around 97% of cases and is often fatal without treatment.

== History ==
The first cases of pneumocystosis affecting lungs were described in premature infants in Europe following the Second World War. It was then known as plasma cellular interstitial pneumonitis of the newborn.

Pneumocystis jirovecii (previously called Pneumocystis carinii) is named for Otto Jírovec, who first described it in 1952.
