= Antonio Carini =

Italian physician and bacteriologist (1872–1950)

- Born: 1872; Sondrio, Italy
- Died: 1950 (aged 77–78); Milan
- Known for: Discovery of Pneumocystis carinii
- Scientific career
- Fields: Microbiology
- Institutions: Pasteur Institute of São Paulo, University of Pavia, Paulista Institute of Biology

Antonio Carini (1872–1950) was an Italian physician, bacteriologist and professor. He worked in the public health services of São Paulo, Brazil for over forty years. Carini showed that rabies of herbivores could be transmitted by bats, and discovered a parasitic fungus (Pneumocystis carinii, now known as P. jirovecii), which causes pneumocystosis.

== Early life ==
Carini was born in Sondrio, Italy.

In 1906, aged 34, he was invited to run the Pasteur Institute of São Paulo, a position he held until 1914.

== The discovery of Pneumocystis carinii ==
In 1909, examining the lungs of guinea pigs experimentally infected with Trypanosoma cruzi, Carlos Chagas described parasitic forms that linked the pulmonary cycle of the trypanosome. But in 1910, Carini and Maciel Jesuino found cyst formations very similar to these parasitic forms when examining the lungs of rats living in the sewers and naturally infected by Trypanosoma lewisi. Carini sent the biological material from São Paulo to French researchers Pierre and Eugénie Delanoë at the Institut Pasteur in Paris. In 1912, after studying the material, they confirmed that the parasite was indeed different from T. cruzi and called it Pneumocystis carinii, in honour of the researcher. The Delanoës published the first description of the organism as something different from trypanosomes.

In 1942, two Dutch researchers, G. van der Meer and S. L. Brug, were presented three cases in humans (two babies and a 21-year-old adult), affected by a form of pneumonia particularly frequent in Central Europe, especially in frail or dystrophic premature children. In the 1980s, investigations into its molecular biology made clear that the pneumonia was not caused by a parasitic protozoan, but by a fungus. In the same years, Pneumocystis carinii was often held responsible for severe lung infections in patients affected by AIDS. In 1999, the human variant of Pneumocystis carinii was renamed Pneumocystis jirovecii, but the former name is still commonly used.

Carini was Professor of Microbiology at the Faculty of Medicine, University of Pavia and a prolific researcher in medical microbiology. He identified or studied over 150 new or little-known micro-organisms, including trypanosomes, Giardia, pneumocystis, plasmodia, toxoplasma, and Leptospira.

== Later life ==
In 1947, he retired from the leadership of the Paulista Institute of Biology and returned to Italy. He died in Milan three years later, aged 78.
