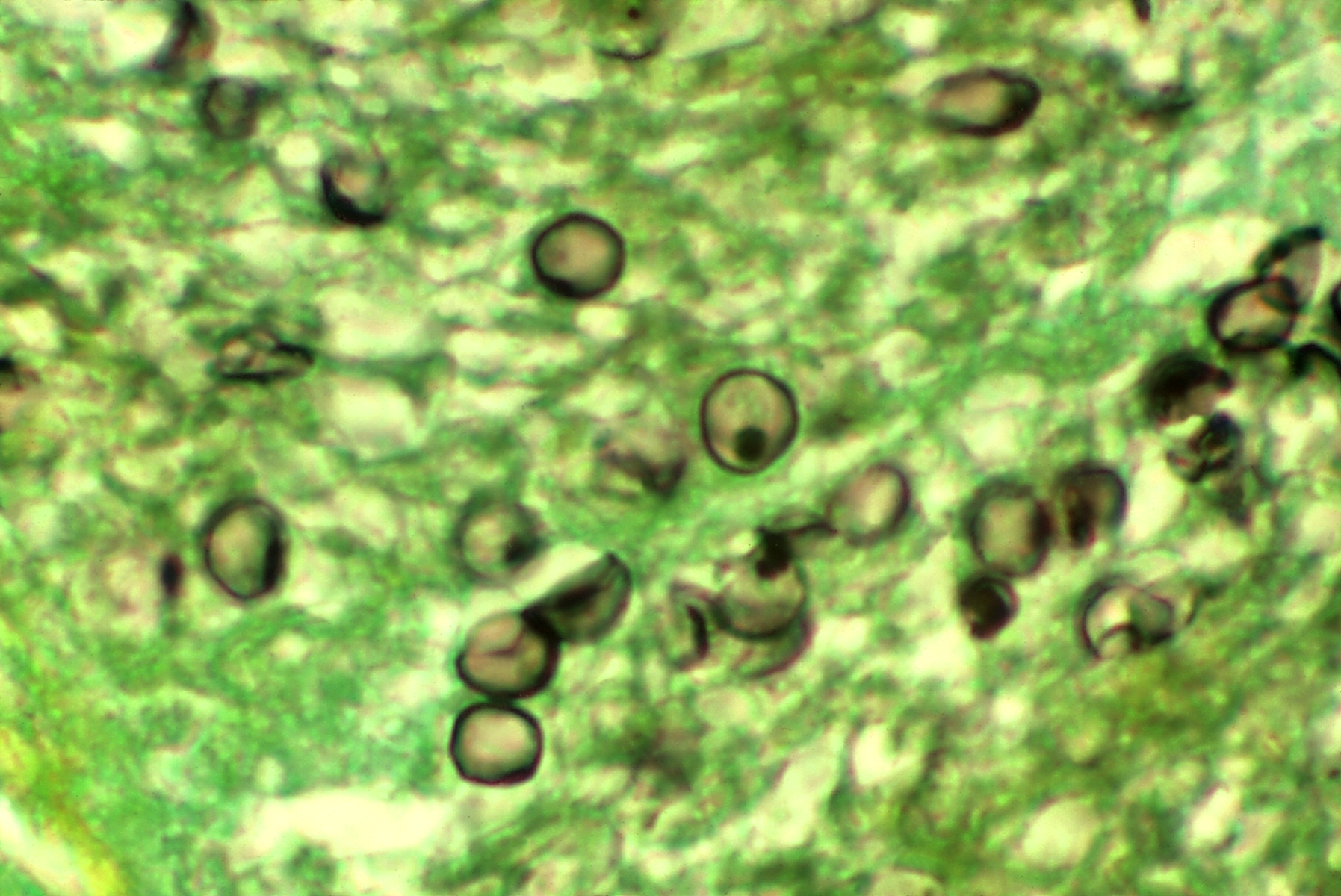
- P. jirovecii cysts in tissue (Grocott's methenamine silver stain)

Scientific classification
- Kingdom: Fungi
- Division: Ascomycota
- Class: Pneumocystidomycetes
- Order: Pneumocystidales
- Family: Pneumocystidaceae
- Genus: Pneumocystis
- Species: P. jirovecii

Binomial name
- Pneumocystis jirovecii J.K.Frenkel

Synonyms
- Pneumocystis carinii

= Pneumocystis jirovecii =

Species of fungus

Pneumocystis jirovecii (previously P. carinii) is a yeast-like fungus of the genus Pneumocystis. The causative organism of Pneumocystis pneumonia, it is an important human pathogen, particularly among immunocompromised hosts. Prior to its discovery as a human-specific pathogen, P. jirovecii was known as P. carinii.

== Lifecycle ==
The complete lifecycles of any of the species of Pneumocystis are not known, but presumably all resemble the others in the genus. The terminology follows zoological terms, rather than mycological terms, reflecting the initial misdetermination as a protozoan parasite. This species is an extracellular fungus. All stages are found in lungs and because they cannot be cultured ex vivo, direct observation of living Pneumocystis is difficult. The trophozoite stage is thought to be equivalent to the so-called vegetative state of other species (such as Schizosaccharomyces pombe), which like Pneumocystis, belong to the Taphrinomycotina branch of the fungal kingdom. The trophozoite stage is single-celled, appears amoeboid (multilobed), and is closely associated with host cells.

Globular cysts eventually form that have a thicker wall. Within these ascus-like cysts, eight spores form, which are released through rupture of the cyst wall. The cysts often collapse, forming crescent-shaped bodies visible in stained tissue. Whether meiosis takes place within the cysts, or what the genetic status is of the various cell types, is not known for certain.

=== Homothallism ===
The lifecycle of P. jirovecii is thought to include both asexual and sexual phases. Asexual multiplication of haploid cells likely occurs by binary fission. The mode of sexual reproduction appears to be primary homothallism, a form of self-fertilization. The sexual phase takes place in the host's lungs. This phase is presumed to involve formation of a diploid zygote, followed by meiosis, and then production of an ascus containing the products of meiosis, eight haploid ascospores. The ascospores may be disseminated by airborne transmission to new hosts.

== Medical relevance ==
Pneumocystis pneumonia is a significant disease affecting immunocompromised individuals—particularly those with HIV infection, but also those with severely suppressed immune systems due to various reasons, such as bone marrow transplants. In individuals with a functioning immune system, P. jirovecii is an exceptionally common but usually asymptomatic infection. Pneumocystis pneumonia can be identified by methenamine silver stain of lung tissue.

Type I pneumocytes and type II pneumocytes over-replicate and damage alveolar epithelium, possibly leading to death by asphyxiation. Mucosal fluid leaks into alveoli, producing an exudate of an honeycomb/cotton candy appearance on hematoxylin and eosin-stained slides. Drugs of choice are trimethoprim/sulfamethoxazole, pentamidine, or dapsone. In those with HIV, most cases occur when the CD4 count is below 200 cells per microliter.

== Nomenclature ==
At first, the name Pneumocystis carinii was applied to the organisms found in both rats and humans, as the parasite was not yet known to be host-specific. In 1976, the name "Pneumocystis jiroveci" was proposed for the first time, to distinguish the organism found in humans from variants of Pneumocystis in other animals. The organism was named thus in honor of Czech parasitologist Otto Jírovec, who described Pneumocystis pneumonia in humans in 1952. After DNA analysis showed significant differences in the human variant, the proposal was made again in 1999 and has come into common use.

The name was spelled according to the International Code of Zoological Nomenclature, since the organism was believed to be a protozoan. After it became clear that it was a fungus, the name was changed to Pneumocystis jirovecii, according to the International Code of Nomenclature for algae, fungi, and plants (ICNafp), which requires such names be spelled with double i (ii). Both spellings are commonly used, but according to the ICNafp, P. jirovecii is correct. A change in the ICNafp now recognizes the validity of the 1976 publication, making the 1999 proposal redundant, and cites Pneumocystis and P. jiroveci as examples of the change in ICN Article 45, Ex 7. The name P. jiroveci is typified (both lectotypified and epitypified) by samples from human autopsies dating from the 1960s.

The term PCP, which was widely used by practitioners and patients, has been retained for convenience, with the rationale that it now stands for the more general Pneumocystis pneumonia rather than Pneumocystis carinii pneumonia.

The name P. carinii is incorrect for the human variant, but still describes the species found in rats, and that name is typified by an isolate from rats.

== Pneumocystis genome ==
Pneumocystis species cannot be grown in axenic culture, so the availability of the human disease-causing agent, P. jirovecii, is limited. Hence, investigation of the whole genome of a Pneumocystis is largely based upon true P. carinii available from experimental rats, which can be maintained with infections. Genetic material of other species, such as P. jirovecii, can be compared to the genome of P. carinii.

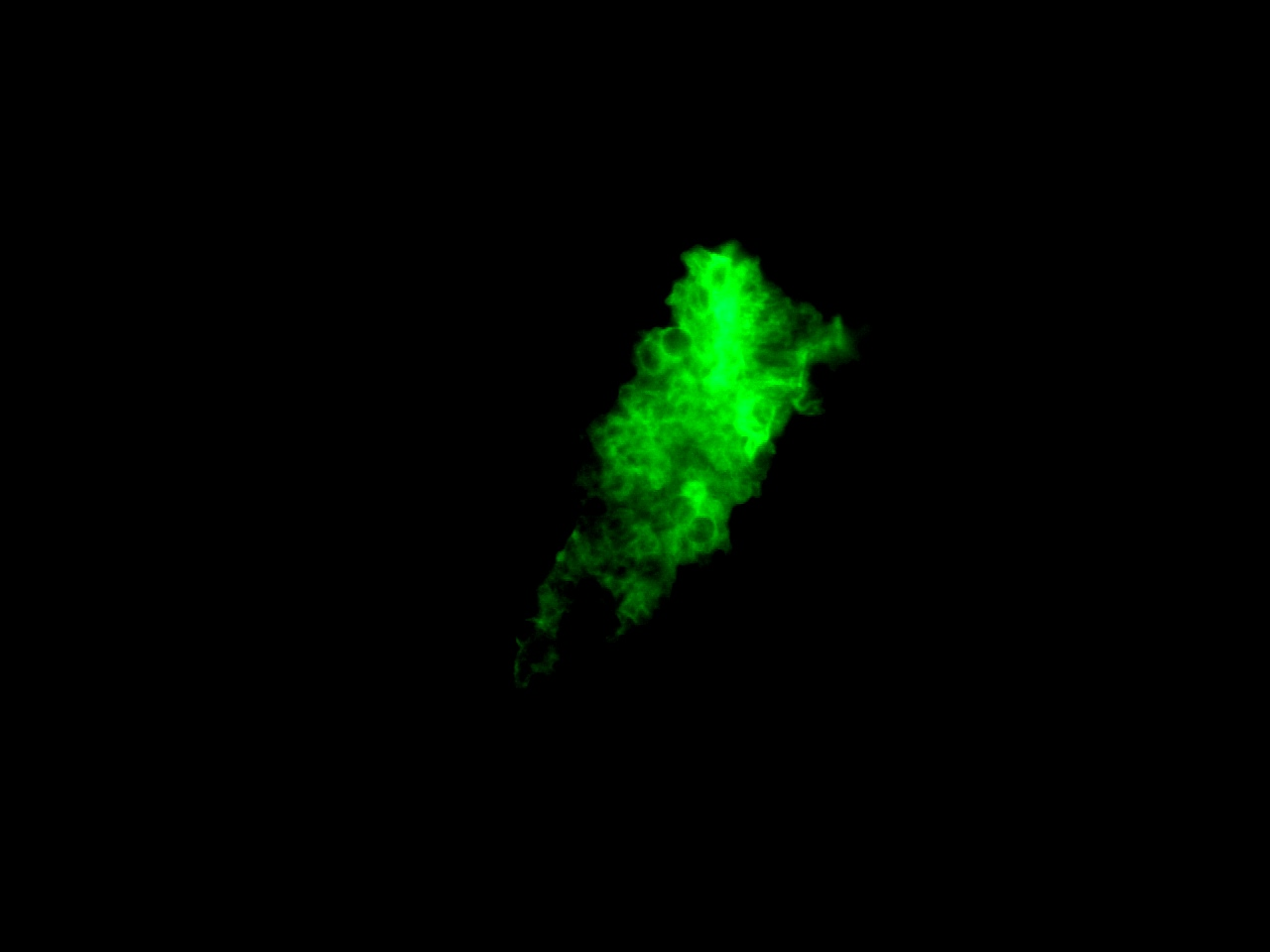
Microscopy image of P. jirovecii

The genome of P. jirovecii has been sequenced from a bronchoalveolar lavage sample. The genome is small, low in G+C content, and lacks most amino-acid biosynthesis enzymes.

== History ==
The earliest report of this genus appears to have been that of Carlos Chagas in 1909, who discovered it in experimental animals, but confused it with part of the lifecycle of Trypanosoma cruzi (causal agent of Chagas disease) and later called both organisms Schizotrypanum cruzi, a form of trypanosome infecting humans. The rediscovery of Pneumocystis cysts was reported by Antonio Carini in 1910, also in Brazil. The genus was again discovered in 1912 by Delanoë and Delanoë, this time at the Pasteur Institute in Paris, who found it in rats and proposed the genus and species name Pneumocystis carinii after Carini.

Pneumocystis was redescribed as a human pathogen in 1942 by two Dutch investigators, van der Meer and Brug, who found it in three new cases: a 3-month-old infant with congenital heart disease and in two of 104 autopsy cases – a 4-month-old infant and a 21-year-old adult. There being only one described species in the genus, they considered the human parasite to be P. carinii. Nine years later (1951), Dr. Josef Vanek at Charles University in Prague, Czechoslovakia, showed in a study of lung sections from 16 children that the organism labelled "P. carinii" was the causative agent of pneumonia in these children. The following year, Czech scientist Otto Jírovec reported "P. carinii" as the cause of interstitial pneumonia in neonates. Following the realization that Pneumocystis from humans could not experimentally infect rats, and that the rat form of Pneumocystis differed physiologically and had different antigenic properties, Frenkel was the first to recognize the human pathogen as a distinct species. He named it "Pneumocystis jiroveci" (corrected to P. jirovecii - see nomenclature above). Controversy existed over the relabeling of P. carinii in humans as P. jirovecii, which is why both names continued to appear in publications. However, the name P. jirovecii is used exclusively for the human pathogen, whereas the name P. carinii has had a broader application to many species. Frenkel and those before him believed that all Pneumocystis were protozoans, but soon afterwards evidence began accumulating that Pneumocystis was a fungal genus.

Recent studies show it to be an unusual, in some ways a primitive genus of Ascomycota, related to a group of yeasts. Every tested primate, including humans, appears to have its own type of Pneumocystis that is incapable of cross-infecting other host species and has co-evolved with each species. Currently, only five species have been formally named: P. jirovecii from humans, P. carinii as originally named from rats, P. murina from mice, P. wakefieldiae also from rats, and P. oryctolagi from rabbits.

Historical and even recent reports of P. carinii from humans are based upon older classifications (still used by many, or those still debating the recognition of distinct species in the genus Pneumocystis) which does not mean that the true P. carinii from rats actually infects humans. In an intermediate classification system, the various taxa in different mammals have been called formae speciales or forms. For example, the human "form" was called Pneumocystis carinii f. [or f. sp.] hominis, while the original rat infecting form was called Pneumocystis carinii f. [or f. sp.] carinii. This terminology is still used by some researchers. The species of Pneumocystis originally seen by Chagas have not yet been named as distinct species. Many other undescribed species presumably exist and those that have been detected in many mammals are only known from molecular sample detection from lung tissue or fluids, rather than by direct physical observation. Currently, they are cryptic taxa.
