= Grocott's methenamine silver stain =

Staining method in histology

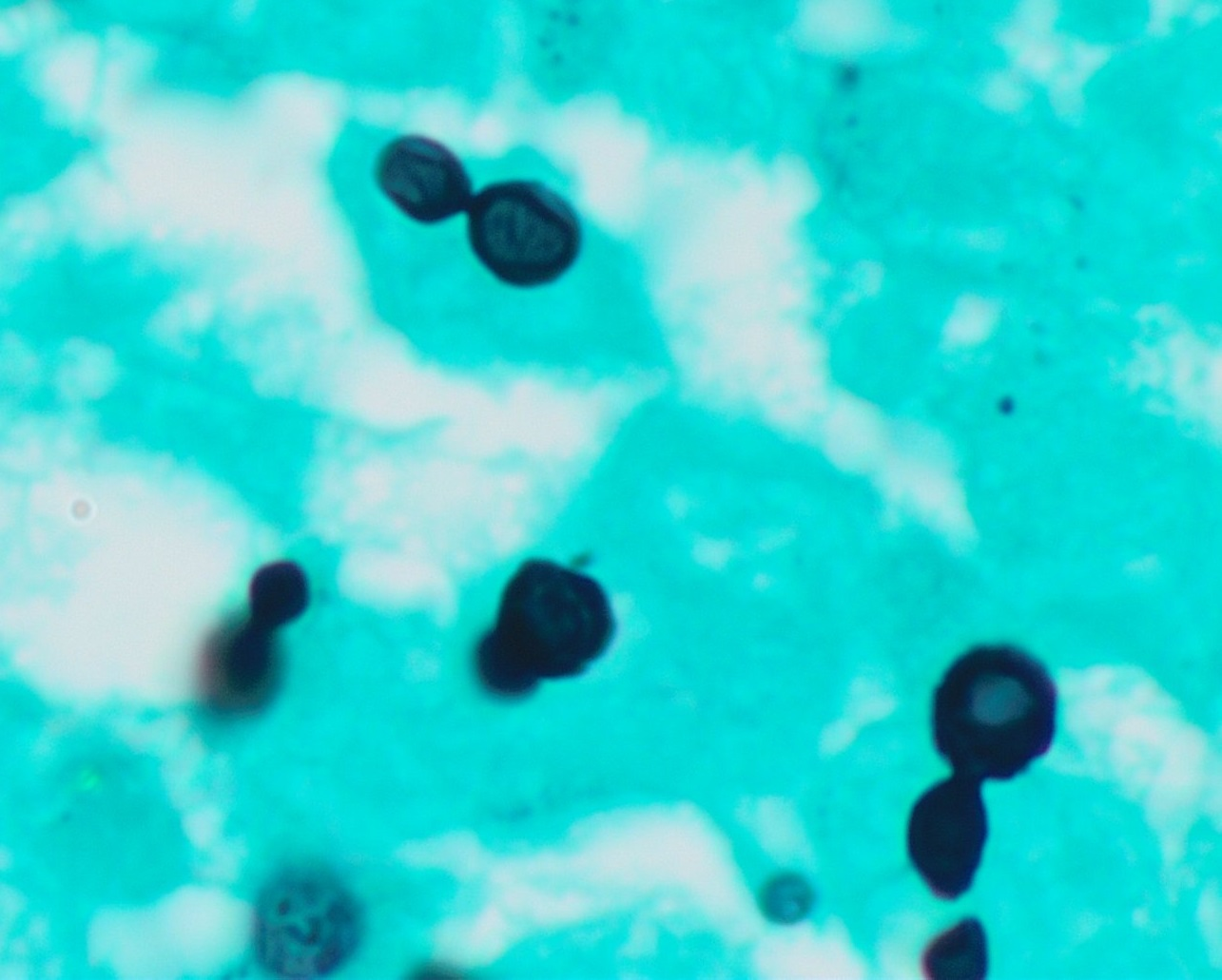
A small intestine sample stained using the Grocott's methenamine silver stain demonstrating histoplasma (black round yeast with narrow budding) in a granuloma

In pathology, the Grocott–Gömöri's methenamine silver stain, abbreviated GMS, is a popular staining method in histology. The stain was originally named after Robert G. Grocott and György Gömöri, who developed the stain.

It is used widely as a screen for fungal organisms. It is particularly useful in staining carbohydrates.

It can be used to identify the yeast-like fungus Pneumocystis jiroveci, which causes a form of pneumonia called Pneumocystis pneumonia (PCP) or pneumocystosis.

The cell walls of these organisms are outlined by the brown to black stain.

The principle of GMS is the reduction of silver ions, which renders the fungal cell wall either black or brown. The fungal cell wall commonly contains polysaccharides. In a GMS procedure, chromic acid is first used to oxidize polysaccharides, generating aldehydes. Then Grocott's alkaline hexamine-silver solution is applied, where the silver ions are reduced to black amorphous silver. The reduction reaction by the fungal cell wall is often known as argentaffin reaction.

== See also ==
- Methenamine
