= Otto Jírovec =

Otto Jírovec (January 31, 1907 – March 7, 1972) was a Czechoslovak professor of parasitology and protozoology.

A significant fungus parasite of humans, Pneumocystis jirovecii, is named in his honour. Pneumocystis jirovecii (formerly known as the human form of Pneumocystis carinii; originally spelled P. jiroveci when believed to be a protozoan) causes Pneumocystis pneumonia (PCP).

== Early life and education ==
Jírovec was born in Prague. In 1929 he obtained a doctorate at the Faculty of Science at the Charles University in Prague. From 1930 to 1932 he worked as a lecturer, and in 1933 he became an associate professor. During the war he worked as head of the Parasitology Laboratory at the State Health Institute. After the war, he returned to the faculty of the university. In 1948 he was again appointed associate professor at the Charles University in Prague. In the years 1949–1952 Jírovec led the Department of Zoology, and later managed a zoological institute. From 1954 to 1961 he led the Czechoslovak Academy of Sciences Laboratory of Parasitology.

== Research ==
Otto Jirovec started his career studying microsporidia. He also published work on Trichomonas vaginalis, Leptospirra, and Toxoplasma.

In his professional work he focused in particular on the study of parasitic protozoa, both in temperate and in tropical regions. One of his most important discoveries was the pathogen causing Pneumocystis pneumonia, which he made with the pathologist Josef Vaněk in 1953. Jírovec continued to make contributions to the understanding of the epidemiology of PCP and the development of the parasite.

== Books ==
Otto Jírovec wrote 11 books, published some 280 research articles, and 250 articles popularizing research work.

== Awards ==
Otto Jírovec received various awards for his work. He was a member of the Royal Czech Society of Sciences, Masaryk Academy of Labor and the Czechoslovak National Council research. In 1953, he became a corresponding member of the Czechoslovak Academy of Sciences. He was awarded an honorary doctorate by the Medical Faculty of Humboldt University in Berlin and the Faculty of Science of the University of Clermont-Ferrand.
