= Silver staining =

Using silver compounds to add colour

In pathology, silver staining is the use of silver to selectively alter the appearance of a target in microscopy of histological sections; in temperature gradient gel electrophoresis; and in polyacrylamide gels.

== History ==
Camillo Golgi perfected silver staining for the study of the nervous system. Although the exact chemical mechanism by which this occurs is unknown, Golgi's method stains a limited number of cells at random in their entirety.

Silver staining was introduced by Kerenyi and Gallyas as a sensitive procedure to detect trace amounts of proteins in gels. The technique has been extended to the study of other biological macromolecules that have been separated in a variety of supports.

Classical Coomassie brilliant blue staining can usually detect a 50 ng protein band; silver staining increases the sensitivity typically 50 times.

Many variables can influence the color intensity and every protein has its own staining characteristics; clean glassware, pure reagents, and water of highest purity are the key points to successful staining.

== Chemistry ==
Some cells are argentaffin. These reduce silver solution to metallic silver after formalin fixation. Other cells are argyrophilic. These reduce silver solution to metallic silver after being exposed to the stain that contains a reductant, for example hydroquinone or formalin.

Silver nitrate forms insoluble silver phosphate with phosphate ions; this method is known as the Von Kossa Stain. When subjected to a reducing agent, usually hydroquinone, it forms black elementary silver. This is used for study of formation of calcium phosphate particles during bone growth.

== Applications ==
=== Histological characterisation ===
Silver staining aids the visualization of targets of interest, namely intracellular and extracellular cellular components such as DNA and proteins, such as type III collagen and reticulin fibres by the deposition of metallic silver particles on the targets of interest.

=== Diagnostic microbiology ===
Pseudomonas, Legionella, Leptospira, H. pylori, Bartonella and Treponema, and fungi such as Pneumocystis, Cryptococcus, and Candida are organisms that are stained with silver.

=== Karyotype analysis ===
Silver staining is used in karyotyping. Silver nitrate stains the nucleolar organization region (NOR)-associated protein, producing a dark region wherein the silver is deposited and denoting the activity of rRNA genes within the NOR. Human chromosomes 13, 14, 15, 21, and 22 have NORs, which increase the silver stain activity by at least 50 times.

=== Genomic and proteomic analysis ===
Silver staining is used to stain gels. The silver stain of proteins in Agarose gels was developed in 1973 by Kerenyi and Gallyas. Later it was adapted to polyacrylamide gels used in SDS-PAGE, and also for staining DNA or RNA. The glycosylations of glycoproteins and polysaccharides can be oxidised by a 1-hour pre-treatment with 0.1% periodic acid at 4 °C, which improves the binding of silver ions and the staining result.

First, the proteins are denatured in the gel by a fixative solution of 10% acetic acid and 30% ethanol and precipitated, at the same time the detergent (mostly SDS) is extracted. The diffusion of the proteins is thus significantly reduced. After repeated washing with water, the gel is incubated in a silver nitrate solution. Silver ions bind to negatively charged side chains of the proteins. Excess silver ions are then washed off with water. In the final development step, the silver ions are reduced to elemental silver by addition of alkaline formaldehyde. This stains the sites where proteins are present, brown to black.

The intensity of the staining depends on the primary structure of the protein. Furthermore, the cleanliness of the vessels used and the purity of the reagents influence the silver stain. Common artifacts in silver stained gels are bands of keratin in the ranges of 54–57 kDa and 65–68 kDa as a contamination of the sample prior to electrophoresis.

=== Methenamine silver stains ===
There are several silver stains incorporating methenamine, including:

- Grocott's methenamine silver stain, used widely as a screen for fungal organisms.
- Jones' stain, a methenamine silver–periodic acid–Schiff that stains for basement membrane, availing to view the "spiked" GBM associated with membranous glomerulonephritis.

== Gallery ==
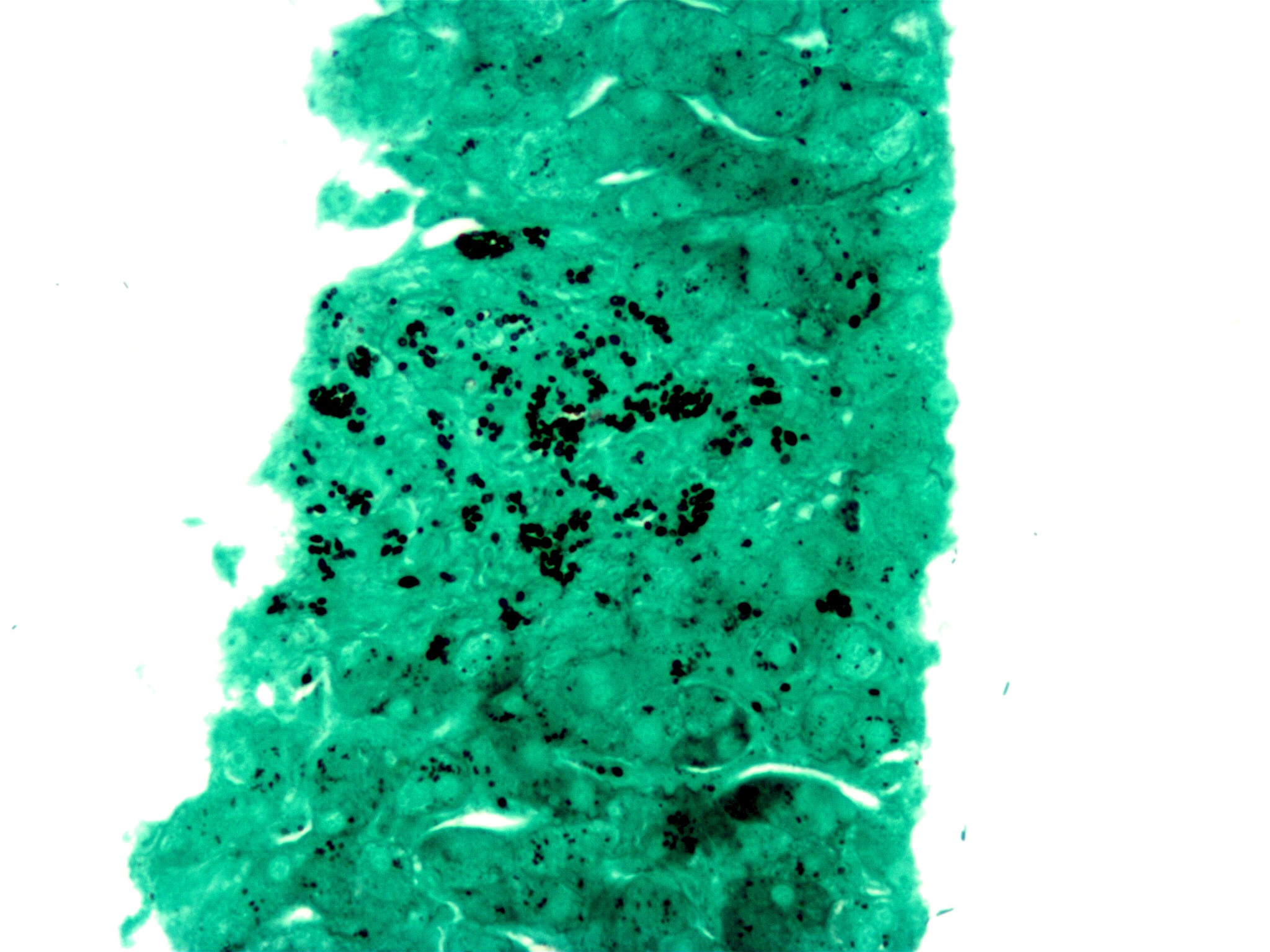
A silver stain (GMS) demonstrating the fungus Histoplasma (black round balls) in a liver biopsy.

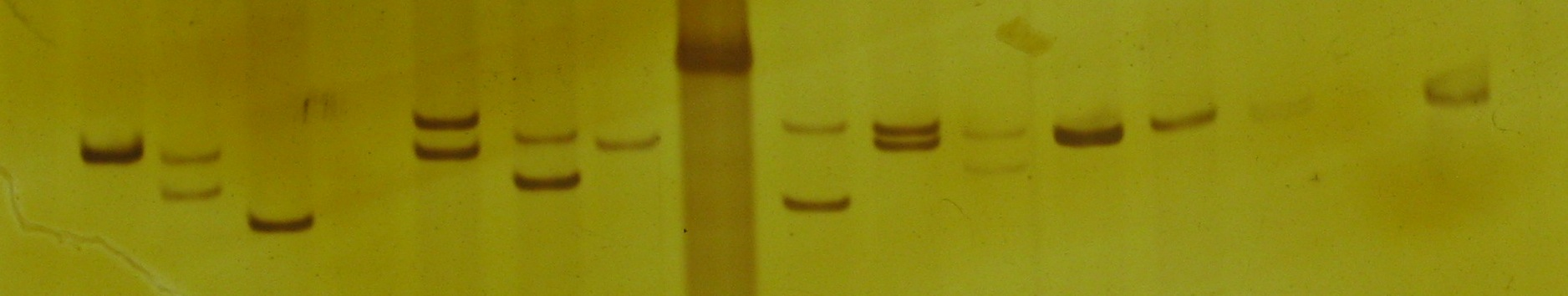
DNA samples amplified using PCR. Samples have been visualized using silver staining.

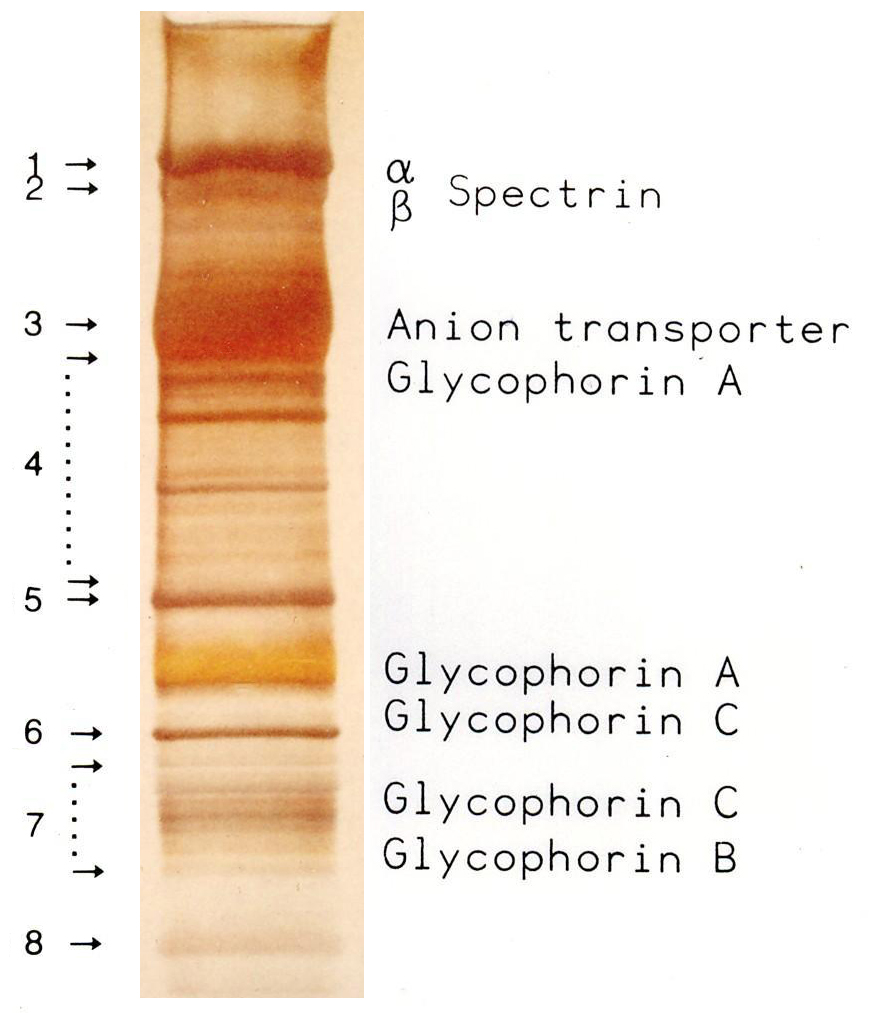
RBC membrane proteins separated by SDS-PAGE and silver-stained.
